This is a growing list of territorial Catholic dioceses and ordinariates in communion with the Holy See. There are approximately 3,000 actual (i.e., non-titular) dioceses in the Catholic Church (including the eparchies of the Eastern Catholic Churches).
 
 Those dioceses which are (metropolitan or nominal) archdioceses (including archeparchies) are marked in bold type and are also listed at List of Catholic archdioceses.
 Those dioceses which belong to Eastern Catholic Churches (often called "eparchies") are italicized and their particular Churches and proper episcopal titulature are specified after the see name.
 Missionary and other special types of circumscriptions (e.g., apostolic prefectures) are also specified before the country name.

Alphabetical list of geographic dioceses 

{|class=wikitable
|- valign=top
|

A
Aachen (Aix-la-chapelle), Germany
Aba, Nigeria
Abaetetuba, Brazil
Abakaliki, Nigeria
Abancay, Peru
Abengourou, Côte d'Ivoire
Abeokuta, Nigeria
Aberdeen, Scotland, United Kingdom
Abidjan, Côte d'Ivoire
Abomey, Benin
Abuja, Nigeria
Acapulco, Mexico
Acarigua-Araure, Venezuela
Accra, Ghana
Acerenza, Italy
Acerra, Italy
Achonry, Ireland
Acireale, Italy
Acqui, Italy
Addis Abeba, Ethiopian Catholic Archeparchy, Ethiopia
Adelaide, Australia
Adigrat, Ethiopia
Adilabad, India
Adria-Rovigo, Italy
Afogados da Ingazeira, Brazil
Agaña, Guam
Agartala, India
Agats, Indonesia
Agboville, Côte d'Ivoire
Agen, France
Agra, India
Agrigento, Italy
Aguarico, Apostolic Vicariate, Ecuador
Aguascalientes, Mexico
Ahiara, Nigeria
Ahmedabad, India
Ahvaz (Ahwaz), Chaldean Catholic, Iran
Aiquile, Territorial Prelature, Bolivia
Aire-et-Dax, France
Aitape, Papua New Guinea
Aix-Arles-Embrun, France
Aix-la-chapelle: see Aachen
Aizawl, India
Ajaccio, France
Ajmer, India
Akka, Melkite Archeparchy, Israel
Alagoinhas, Brazil
Alajuela, Costa Rica
Alaminos, Philippines
Alba Pompeia, Italy
Alba Iulia, Romania
Albacete, Spain
Albano, Italy
Albany, United States
Albenga-Imperia, Italy
Albi, France
Alcalá de Henares, Spain
Alep (Melkite)*, Syria
Aleppo (Syrian Catholic),*, Syria
Aleppo (Maronite),*, Syria
Aleppo (Armenian),*, Syria
Aleppo, Chaldean Catholic*, Syria
Alep(po), Apostolic Vicariate (Roman Catholic), Syria
Alessandria, Italy
Ales-Terralba, Italy
Alexandria of Egypt(-Heliopolis-Port Said), Apostolic Vicariate, Egypt
Alexandria (Iskanderiya), Armenian Catholic Eparchy, Egypt
Alexandria-Cornwall, Canada
Alexandria in Louisiana, United States
Algiers, Algeria
Alghero-Bosa, Italy
Alife-Caiazzo, Italy
Alindao, Central African Republic
Aliwal, South Africa
Allahabad, India
Allentown, United States
Alleppey, India
Almenara, Brazil
Almería, Spain
Alotau-Sideia, Papua New Guinea
Alquoch, Chaldean Catholic Eparchy, Iraq
Altamura-Gravina-Acquaviva delle Fonti, Italy
Alto Solimões, Brazil
Alto Valle del Río Negro, Argentina
Altoona-Johnstown, United States
Amadiyah, Chaldean Catholic Eparchy, Iraq
Amalfi-Cava de' Tirreni, Italy
Amargosa, Brazil
Amarillo, United States
Ambanja, Madagascar
Ambato, Ecuador
Ambatondrazaka, Madagascar
Ambikapur, India
Amboina, Indonesia
Ambositra, Madagascar
Amiens, France
Amos, Canada
Amparo, Brazil
Amravati, India
Anagni-Alatri, Italy
Anápolis, Brazil
Anatolia, Apostolic Vicariate, (Asian) Turkey
Añatuya, Argentina
Anchorage, United States
Ancona-Osimo, Italy
Andong, South Korea
Andria, Italy
Aného, Togo
Angers, France
Angoulême, France
Angra, Portugal
Anking, China
Ankwo, China
Annecy, France
Annunciation of Ibadan, Maronite Catholic Eparchy, Nigeria
Anse-à-Veau and Miragoâne, Haiti
Antananarivo, Madagascar
Antélias, Lebanon
Antequera, Mexico
Antigonish, Canada
Antipolo, Philippines
Antofagasta, Chile
Antsirabe, Madagascar
Antsiranana, Madagascar
Antwerp, Belgium
Anuradhapura, Sri Lanka
Aosta, Italy
Aparecida, Brazil
Apartadó, Colombia
Apatzingan, Mexico
Apucarana, Brazil
Aqra, Chaldean Catholic Eparchy, Iraq
Aracajú, Brazil
Araçatuba, Brazil
Araçuaí, Brazil
Arauca, Colombia
Arbil, see Erbil, Iraq
Archipelago of the Comores (Archipel des Comores), Apostolic Vicariate, Comoros (& Mayotte)
Ardagh, Ireland
Arecibo, Puerto Rico
Arequipa, Peru
Arezzo-Cortona-Sansepolcro, Italy
Argyll and the Isles, Scotland
Ariano Irpino-Lacedonia, Italy
Arica, Chile
Arlington, United States
Armagh, Northern Ireland
Armenia, Colombia
Armidale, Australia
Arras, France
Arua, Uganda
Arundel and Brighton, United Kingdom
Arusha, Tanzania
Asansol, India
Ascoli Piceno, Italy
Asmara, Eritrean Catholic Archeparchy, Eritrea
Assis, Brazil
Assisi-Nocera Umbra-Gualdo Taldino, Italy
Assiut, Coptic Catholic suffragan, Egypt
Asti, Italy
Astorga, Spain
Asunción, Paraguay
Atakpamé, Togo
Atambua, Indonesia
Athens, Greece
Atlacomulco, Mexico
Atlanta, United States
Atyrau, Apostolic Administration, Kazakhstan
Auch, France
Auchi, Nigeria
Auckland, New Zealand
Augsburg, Germany
Auki, Solomon Islands
Aurangabad, India
Austin, United States
Autlán, Mexico
Autun, France
Aveiro, Portugal
Avellaneda-Lanús, Argentina
Avellino, Italy
Aversa, Italy
Avezzano, Italy
Avignon, France
Avila, Spain
Awasa (Hawassa), Apostolic Vicariate, Ethiopia
Awgu, Nigeria
Awka, Nigeria
Ayacucho, Peru
Ayaviri, Territorial Prelature, Peru
Aysén, Apostolic Vicariate, Chile
Azogues, Ecuador
Azul, Argentina

B
Baalbek, Melkite*, Lebanon
Baalbek – Deir El-Ahmar, Maronite*, Lebanon
Bà Rịa, Vietnam
Babahoyo, Ecuador
Bacabal, Brazil
Bắc Ninh, Vietnam
Bacolod, Philippines
Baku, Apostolic prefecture, (for all) Azerbaijan
Badulla, Sri Lanka
Bafang, Cameroon
Bafatá, Guinea-Bissau
Bafia, Cameroon
Bafoussam, Cameroon
Bagdogra, India
Bagé, Brazil
Baghdad (Armenian), Iraq
Baghdad (Latin), Iraq
Baguio, Philippines
Bahía Blanca, Argentina
Bahir Dar-Dessie, Ethiopian Catholic Eparchy, Ethiopia
Baie-Comeau, Canada
Baker, United States
Balanga, Philippines
Balasore, India
Ballarat, Australia
Balsas, Brazil
Baltimore, United States
Bamako, Mali
Bambari, Central African Republic
Bamberg, Germany
Bamenda, Cameroon
Bandung, Indonesia
Banfora, Burkina Faso
Bangalore, India
Bangassou, Central African Republic
Bangkok, Thailand
Bangued, Philippines
Bangui, Central African Republic
Baní, Dominican Republic
Baniyas, Melkite Catholic ?ArchEparchy, Lebanon
Banja Luka, Bosnia and Herzegovina
Banjarmasin, Indonesia
Banjul, Gambia
Banmaw, Myanmar
Ban Mê Thuôt, Vietnam
Banská Bystrica, Slovakia
Baoding, China PR
Baoqing (Paoking, Shaoyang), Apostolic prefecture, China PR
Bar, Montenegro
Barahona, Dominican Republic
Barbastro–Monzón, Spain
Barcelona, Spain
Barcelona, Venezuela
Bareilly, India
Barentu, Eritrea
Bari-Bitonto, Italy
Barinas, Venezuela
Baroda, India
Barquisimeto, Venezuela
Barra, Brazil
Barra do Garças, Brazil
Barra do Piraí–Volta Redonda, Brazil
Barrancabermeja, Colombia
Barranquilla, Colombia
Barreiras, Brazil
Barretos, Brazil
Baruipur, India
Basankusu, Democratic Republic of the Congo
Basel, Switzerland
Basse-Terre(-Pointe-à-Pitre), Guadeloupe (French)
Bassorah, Basra, Chaldean Catholic ?Archeparchy, Iraq
Bata, Equatorial Guinea
Batanes, Territorial Prelature, Philippines
Bathery, India
Bathurst (in Australia), Australia
Bathurst (in Canada), Canada
Baton Rouge, United States
Batouri, Cameroon
Battambang, Apostolic Prefecture, Cambodia
Batticaloa, Sri Lanka
Baucau, Timor-Leste
Bauchi, Nigeria
Bauru, Brazil
Bayeux, France
Bayombong, Philippines
Bayonne, France
Beatissima Vergine Maria del SS.mo Rosario (Blessed Virgin of the Most Sacred Rosary) aka Pompei, Territorial Prelature, Brazil
Beaumont, United States
Beauvais-Noyons-Senlis, France
Beihai, China
Beijing, China
Beira, Mozambique
Beirut (Armenian), Armenian Catholic ?Archeparchy, Lebanon
Beirut, Chaldean Catholic, Lebanon
Beirut (Maronite), ?Archeparchy, Lebanon
Beirut, Apostolic Vicariate, Latin, Lebanon
Beirut and Byblos (Melkite), ?Archeparchy, Lebanon
Beja, Portugal
Belém do Pará, Brazil
Belfort-Montbéliard, France
Belgaum, India
Belize City-Belmopan, Belize
Bellary, India
Belleville, United States
Belley-Ars, France
Belluno-Feltre, Italy
Belo Horizonte, Brazil
Belthangady, Syro-Malabar Catholic Eparchy, India
Benevento, Italy
Bengbu, China
Benghazi, Apostolic Vicariate, Libya
Benguela, Angola
Benin City, Nigeria
Benjamín Aceval, Paraguay
Beograd, Serbia
Berbérati, Central African Republic
Bereina, Papua New Guinea
Bergamo, Italy
Berhampur, India
Berlin, Germany
Bertoua, Cameroon
Besançon, France
Bethlehem, South Africa
Bettiah, India
Bhadravathi, India
Bhagalpur, India
Bhopal, India
Białystok, Poland
Bida, Nigeria
Biella, Italy
Bielsko–Żywiec, Poland
Bijnor, India
Bilbao, Spain
Biloxi, United States
Birmingham, United Kingdom
Birmingham, United States
Bismarck, United States
Bissau, Guinea-Bissau
Bari-Bitonto, Italy
Bjelovar-Križevci, Croatia
Blantyre, Malawi
Assumption of the Blessed Virgin Mary in Strumica-Skopje, Macedonian Catholic Eparchy, North Macedonia
Blessed Virgin of the Most Sacred Rosary (Beatissima Vergine Maria del SS.mo Rosario) aka Pompei, Territorial Prelature, Brazil
Bloemfontein, South Africa
Blois, France
Bluefields, Nicaragua
Blumenau, Brazil
Bo, Sierra Leone
Boac, Philippines
Bobo-Dioulasso, Burkina Faso
Bocas del Toro, Territorial Prelature, Panama
Bogor, Indonesia
Bogotá, Colombia
Boise, United States
Bokungu–Ikela, Democratic Republic of the Congo
Bologna, Italy
Bolzano-Brixen, Italy
Boma, Democratic Republic of the Congo
Bomadi, Nigeria
Bombay, India
Bom Jesus da Lapa, Brazil
Bom Jesus do Gurguéia, Brazil
Bondo, Democratic Republic of the Congo
Bondoukou, Ivory Coast (Côte d'Ivoire)
Bonfim, Brazil
Bongaigaon, India
Bontoc-Lagawe, Apostolic Vicariate, Philippines 
Borba, Brazil
Bordeaux, France
Borongan, Philippines
Bostra and Hauran, Melkite Greek Catholic Archeparchy, Syria
Bossangoa, Central African Republic
Boston, United States
Botucatu, Brazil
Bouaké, Côte d'Ivoire
Bouar, Central African Republic
Bougainville, Papua New Guinea
Bourges, France
Braga, Portugal
Bragança do Pará, Brazil
Bragança–Miranda, Portugal
Bragança Paulista, Brazil
Brasília, Brazil
Bratislava, Slovakia
Bratislava, Slovak Catholic Eparchy, SlovakiaBrazzaville, Republic of the CongoBreda, Netherlands
Brejo, Brazil
Brentwood, United Kingdom
Brescia, Italy
Bridgeport, United States
Bridgetown, BarbadosBrindisi–Ostuni, ItalyBrisbane, AustraliaBrno, Czech Republic
Broken Bay, Australia
Brooklyn, United States
Broome, Australia
Brownsville, United States
Bruges (Brugge), Belgium
Brunei Darussalam, Apostolic Vicariate, Brunei
Bubanza, BurundiBucaramanga, ColombiaBuchach, Ukrainian Catholic Eparchy, UkraineBucurești (Bucharest), RomaniaBudjala, Democratic Republic of the Congo
Buéa, Cameroon
Buenaventura, ColombiaBuenos Aires, ArgentinaBuffalo, United States
Buga, Colombia
Bùi Chu, VietnamBujumbura, BurundiBukavu, Democratic Republic of the CongoBukoba, TanzaniaBulawayo, ZimbabweBunbury, Australia
Bunda, Tanzania
Bungoma, Kenya
Bunia, Democratic Republic of the CongoBurgos, SpainBurlington, United States
Bururi, Burundi
Busan: see Pusan
Buta, Democratic Republic of the Congo
Butare, Rwanda
Butembo-Beni, Democratic Republic of the Congo
Butuan, Philippines
Buxar, India
Byblos, Maronite*, Lebanon
Bydgoszcz, Poland
Byumba, Rwanda

C
Caacupé, Paraguay
Cabanatuan, Philippines
Cabimas, Venezuela
Cabinda, Angola
Caçador, BrazilCaceres, PhilippinesCachoeira do Sul, Brazil
Cachoeiro de Itapemirim, Brazil
Cádiz y Ceuta, Spain
Caetité, Brazil
Cafayate, Territorial Prelature, ArgentinaCagayan de Oro, PhilippinesCagliari, ItalyCaguas, Puerto Rico
Cahors, France
Caicó, Brazil
Cairns, Australia
Cairo (Maronites), Egypt
Cairo (Chaldean Catholic), Egypt
Cairo (Syrians), Egypt
Cairo (Melkite), Territory Dependent on the Patriarch, Egypt
Cajamarca, Peru
Cajazeiras, Brazil
Cajenna: see CayenneCalabar, NigeriaCalabozo, VenezuelaCalahorra y La Calzada–Logroño, Spain
Calapan, Apostolic Vicariate, Philippines 
Calbayog, PhilippinesCalcutta, IndiaCaldas, Colombia
Calgary, CanadaCali, ColombiaCalicut, India
Callao, Peru
Caltagirone, Italy
Caltanissetta, Italy
Camaçari, BrazilCamagüey, CubaCambrai, FranceCamden, United StatesCamerino–San Severino Marche, ItalyCamiri, Apostolic Vicariate, Bolivia 
Campanha, Brazil
Campeche, Mexico
Camiri, Apostolic Vicariate, Bolivia
Campina Grande, BrazilCampinas, BrazilCampobasso–Boiano, ItalyCampo Grande, BrazilCampo Limpo, Brazil
Campo Maior, Brazil
Campo Mourão, Brazil
Campos, Brazil
Canada, Syrian Catholic Apostolic Exarchate, for all CanadaCanberra and Goulburn, AustraliaCancun-Chetumal, Territorial Prelature, Mexico
Candia, Greece
Canelones, Uruguay
Cân Tho, Vietnam
Caozhou, ChinaCape Coast, GhanaCape Palmas, LiberiaCape Town, South AfricaCap-Haïtien, HaitiCapiz, PhilippinesCapua, ItalyCarabayllo, PeruCaracas, VenezuelaCaraguatatuba, Brazil
Carapeguá, Paraguay
Caratinga, Brazil
Caravelí, Territorial Prelature, Peru
Carcassonne et Narbonne, FranceCardiff, United KingdomCarolina, Brazil
Caroline Islands, Federated States of Micronesia & Palau
Caroní, Apostolic Vicariate, Venezuela 
Carora, Venezuela
Carpi, ItalyCartagena, ColombiaCartagena, Spain
Cartago, Colombia
Cartago, Costa Rica
Caruaru, Brazil
Carúpano, Venezuela
Casale Monferrato, ItalyCascavel, BrazilCaserta, ItalyCashel and Emly, IrelandCassano all'Jonio, Italy
Castanhal, Brazil
Castellaneta, ItalyCastries, Saint LuciaCatamarca, Argentina
Catanduva, BrazilCatania, ItalyCatanzaro–Squillace, ItalyCatarman, Philippines
Caucasus, Apostolic Administration at Tbilisi, Georgia
Caxias do Maranhão, Brazil
Caxias do Sul, Brazil
Caxito, Angola
Cayenne (Cajenna), French GuianaCebu, PhilippinesCefalù, Italy
Celaya, Mexico
Celje, Slovenia
Cerignola–Ascoli Satriano, Italy
Cerreto Sannita–Telese–Sant'Agata de' Goti, Italy
Cesena-Sarsina, Italy
České Budějovice, Czech Republic
Chachapoyas, Peru
Chaco Paraguayo, Apostolic Vicariate, Paraguay 
Chalan Kanoa, Northern Mariana Islands
Chalatenango, El Salvador
Châlons, FranceChambéry–Saint-Jean-de Maurienne–Tarentaise, FranceChanda, IndiaChanganacherry, IndiaChangde, ChinaChangsha, ChinaChanthaburi, Thailand
Chaotung (Zhaotong), Apostolic Prefecture, China PR
Chapecó, Brazil
Charleston, United States
Charlotte, United States
Charlottetown, Canada
Chartres, France
Chascomús, Argentina
Cheju (Jeju), South Korea
Chengde, China
Chengdu, China
Cheongju (Ch'ŏngju), South Korea
Chernivtsi, Ukrainian Catholic Eparchy, Ukraine
Cheyenne, United States
Chiang Mai, Thailand
Chiang Rai, Thailand
Chiavari, ItalyChicago, United StatesChiclayo, Peru
Chicoutimi, CanadaChieti-Vasto, ItalyChifeng, ChinaChihuahua, MexicoChikmagalur, India
Chikwawa, Malawi
Chilaw, Sri Lanka
Chillán, Chile
Chilpancingo–Chilapa, Mexico
Chimbote, Peru
Chimoio, Mozambique
Chingleput, India
Chinhoyi, Zimbabwe
Chioggia, Italy
Chios, Greece
Chipata, Zambia
Chiquinquirá, Colombia
Chişinău, Moldova
Chitré, PanamaChittagong, BangladeshCholuteca, HondurasChongqing, ChinaChŏnju: see Jeonju
Ch'ŏngju: see Cheongju
Chosica, Panama
Chota, Territorial Prelature, Peru
Christchurch, New Zealand
Chulucanas, Peru
Chunchun (Ch'unch'on/ Chuncheon/ Chunchon), North & South Korea
Chuquibamba, Territorial Prelature, Peru
Chuquibambilla, Territorial Prelature, Peru
Chur, Switzerland 
Churchill-Baie d'Hudson, Canada
Ciego de Avila, Cuba
Cienfuegos, CubaCincinnati, United StatesCittà di Castello, Italy
Ciudad Altamirano, MexicoCiudad Bolívar, VenezuelaCiudad del Este, Panama
Ciudad Guayana, Venezuela
Ciudad Guzmán, Mexico
Ciudad Juárez, Mexico
Ciudad Lázaro Cárdenas, Mexico
Ciudad Obregón, Mexico
Ciudad Quesada, Costa Rica
Ciudad Real, Spain
Ciudad Rodrigo, Spain
Ciudad Valles, Mexico
Ciudad Victoria, Mexico
Civita Castellana, Italy
Civitavecchia–Tarquinia, ItalyClermont, FranceCleveland, United States
Clifton, United Kingdom
Clogher, Ireland
Clonfert, Ireland
Cloyne, Ireland
Cluj-Gherla, Romania
Coatzacoalcos, MexicoCochabamba, BoliviaCochin, India
Coimbatore, India
Coimbra, Portugal
Colatina, BrazilCologne, GermanyColima, MexicoColombo, Sri Lanka & MaldivesColón–Kuna Yala, Panama
Colorado Springs, United States
Colombia, Maronite Catholic Apostolic Exarchate, for all Colombia
Columbus, United States
Comayagua, Honduras
Como, Italy
Comodoro Rivadavia, ArgentinaConakry, GuineaConcepción, ChileConcepción, Argentina
Concepción, Paraguay
Concordia, Argentina
Concordia-Pordenone, Italy
Constantine, Algeria
Conversano-Monopoli, Italy
Copenhagen, Denmark
Copiapó, ChileCórdoba, ArgentinaCórdoba, Spain
Córdoba, MexicoCorfù–Zante–Cefalonia, GreeceCoria–Cáceres, Spain
Cork and Ross, Ireland
Cornélio Procópio, Brazil
Corner Brook and Labrador, CanadaCoro, VenezuelaCoroatá, Brazil
Corocoro, Territorial Prelature, Bolivia
Coroico, Bolivia
Coronel Oviedo, Paraguay
Corpus Christi, United StatesCorrientes, ArgentinaCorumbá, BrazilCosenza–Bisignano, ItalyCotabato, PhilippinesCotonou, BeninCoutances, France
Covington, United States
Coxim, Brazil
Crateús, Brazil
Crato, Brazil
Crema, Italy
Cremona, Italy
Créteil, France
Criciúma, Brazil
Crimea (Krym), at Simferopol, Ukrainian Catholic Archiepiscopal Exarchate, Ukraine 
Cristalândia, Brazil
Crookston, United StatesCrotone–Santa Severina, ItalyCruz Alta, Brazil
Cruz das Almas, Brazil
Cruz del Eje, Argentina
Cruzeiro do Sul, Brazil
Cuauhtémoc-Madera, Mexico
Cuautitlán, Mexico
Cubao, Philippines
Cúcuta, Colombia
Cuddapah, IndiaCuenca, EcuadorCuenca, Spain
Cuernavaca, MexicoCuiabá, BrazilCuliacán, MexicoCumaná, VenezuelaCuneo, ItalyCuritiba, BrazilCuritiba, São João Batista em(=in) – (Ukrainian), Ukrainian Catholic Archeparchy, BrazilCuritiba, São João Batista em/in – (Latin): see São João Batista em CuritibaCuttack-Bhubaneswar, IndiaCuzco, PeruCyangugu, RwandaCyprus (Maronite), at *, CyprusCzęstochowa, PolandD
Daegu: see Taegu
Daejeon (Taejŏn), South Korea
Daet, PhilippinesDakar, SenegalĐakovo-Osijek, Croatia
Dali, China PR
Đà Lạt, Vietnam
Dallas, United States
Daloa, Côte d'Ivoire
Daltonganj, India
Damascus (Syriac)*, SyriaDamascus (Maronite), SyriaDaming, China
Damongo, Ghana
Đà Nẵng, Vietnam
Danlí, Honduras
Dapaong, TogoDar es Salaam, TanzaniaDarién, Apostolic Vicariate, Panama 
Darjeeling, India & Bhutan
Daru-Kiunga, Papua New Guinea
Darwin, Australia
Dassa-Zoumé, Benin
Datong, China
Daule, EcuadorDavao, PhilippinesDavenport, United States
David, Panama
De Aar, South Africa
Deán Funes, Territorial Prelature, Argentina
Debrecen-Nyíregyháza, Hungary
Dédougou, Burkina Faso
Dedza, MalawiDelhi, IndiaDenpasar, IndonesiaDenver, United StatesDerna, Apostolic Vicariate, Libya 
Derry, Northern Ireland
Des Moines, United StatesDetroit, United StatesDhaka, BangladeshDharmapuri, IndiaDiamantina, BrazilDiamantino, BrazilDiarbekir, Chaldean Catholic Archeparchy, TurkeyDibrugarh, India
Diébougou, Burkina Faso
Digne, France
Digos, PhilippinesDijon, FranceDíli, East Timor (Timor-Leste)
Dinajpur, Bangladesh
Dindigul, India
Diphu, India
Dipolog, Philippines
Divinópolis, Brazil
Djibouti, Djibouti
Djougou, Benin
Doba, ChadDodoma, TanzaniaDodge City, United States
Dolisie, Republic of the Congo
Doko, Nigeria
Donghai (Haichow / Haizhou), Apostolic prefecture, China PR
Donetsk, Ukrainian Catholic Archiepiscopal Exarchate, Ukraine 
Donkorkrom, Apostolic Vicariate, Ghana 
Dori, Burkina Faso
Doruma–Dungu, Democratic Republic of the CongoDouala, CameroonDoumé–Abong' Mbang, Cameroon
Dourados, Brazil
Down and Connor, Northern Ireland
Dresden-Meißen, Germany
Drohiczyn, Poland
Dromore, Northern IrelandDublin, IrelandDubrovnik, CroatiaDubuque, United StatesDuitama-Sogamoso, Colombia
Duluth, United States
Dumaguete, Philippines
Dumka, India
Dundee, South Africa
Dundo, Angola
Dunedin, New Zealand
Dunkeld, Scotland
Duque de Caxias, BrazilDurango, MexicoDurban, South AfricaE
East Anglia, United Kingdom
Ebebiyin, Equatorial Guinea
Ebolowa-Kribi, Cameroon
Ecatepec, Mexico
Edéa, CameroonEdmonton, Canada
Edmonton, Ukrainian Catholic Eparchy, Canada
Edmundston, CanadaEger, HungaryEichstätt, Germany
Eisenstadt, Austria
Ekiti, Nigeria
El Alto, Bolivia
El Banco, Colombia
El Beni, Apostolic Vicariate, Bolivia
Elbląg, Poland
Eldoret, Kenya
Ełk, Poland
El Nayar (Jesús María d'), Territorial Prelature, Mexico
El Obeid, Sudan
El Paso, United States
El Petén, Apostolic Vicariate, Guatemala
Elphin, Ireland
El Salto, Territorial Prelature, Mexico
El Tigre, Venezuela
Eluru, India
El Vigia–San Carlos del Zulia, Venezuela
Embu, Kenya
Emdeber, Ethiopian Catholic Eparchy, Ethiopia
Encarnación, ParaguayEnde, IndonesiaEngativá, Colombia
Ensenada, Mexico
Enugu, Nigeria
Erexim, Brazil
Erfurt, Germany
Erie, United StatesErnakulam-Angamaly, Syro-Malabar Catholic Archeparchy, India
Escuintla, Guatemala
Eséka, Cameroon
Eshowe, South Africa
Esmeraldas, Apostolic Vicariate, Ecuador
Espinal, Colombia
Esquel, Territorial Prelature, Argentina
Essen, Germany
Estância, Brazil
Estelí, Nicaragua
Estonia, Apostolic Administration, at Tallinn, in and for all EstoniaEsztergom-Budapest, HungaryEunápolis, Brazil
Evansville, United States
Evinayong, Equatorial GuineaÉvora, PortugalÉvreux, France
Évry-Corbeil-Essonnes, France

|
F
Facatativá, Colombia
Fada N'Gourma, Burkina FasoFăgăraş (and Alba Iulia), Romanian 'Greek' Catholic Archeparchy, RomaniaFaenza–Modigliana, Italy
Fairbanks, United States
Faisalabad, Pakistan
Fajardo-Humacao, Puerto Rico
Falkland Islands, Apostolic Prefecture, Falkland Islands (UK)
Fall River, United States
Fano–Fossombrone–Cagli–Pergola, Italy
Farafangana, Madagascar
Fabriano–Matelica, Italy
Fargo, United States
Faridabad, Syro-Malabar Catholic Eparchy, India
Faro, PortugalFeira de Santana, BrazilFeldkirch, Austria
Fengxian, China
Fenoarivo Atsinanana, Madagascar
Fengyang, ChinaFermo, ItalyFerns, IrelandFerrara-Comacchio, ItalyFianarantsoa, MadagascarFidenza, Italy
Fiesole, ItalyFlorence, ItalyFlorencia, ColombiaFloresta, Brazil
Floriano, BrazilFlorianópolis, BrazilFlorida, UruguayFoggia-Bovino, ItalyFoligno, Italy
Fontibón, Colombia
Forlì–Bertinoro, Italy
Formosa(e), Argentina
Formosa (Formosensis), BrazilFortaleza, BrazilFort-de-France, MartiniqueFort-Liberté, Haiti
Fort Portal, Uganda
Fort Wayne-South Bend, United States
Fort Worth, United States
Fossano, Italy
Foz do Iguaçu, Brazil
Franca, Brazil
Franceville, Gabon
Francistown, Botswana
Frascati, Italy
Frederico Westphalen, BrazilFreetown, Sierra LeoneFreiburg im Breisgau, GermanyFréjus-Toulon, France
Fresno, United States
Frosinone–Veroli–Ferentino, Italy
Fukuoka, Japan
Fulda, Germany
Funchal, Portugal
Funing, China
Fushun, ChinaFuzhou, ChinaG
Gaborone, BotswanaGaeta, ItalyGagnoa, Côte d'IvoireGalápagos, Apostolic Vicariate, Botswana
Galle, Sri Lanka
Galloway, United Kingdom
Gallup, United StatesGalveston-Houston, United StatesGalway and Kilmacduagh, Ireland
Gambella, Apostolic Vicariate, Ethiopia
Gamboma, Republic of the CongoGandhinagar, IndiaGanzhou, China
Gaoua, Burkina Faso
Gap, France
Garagoa, Colombia
Garanhuns, Brazil
Garissa, KenyaGaroua, CameroonGary, United States
Garzón, Colombia
Gaspé, CanadaGatineau, CanadaGaylord, United States
Gbarnga, LiberiaGdańsk, PolandGeita, TanzaniaGenova, ItalyGent: see Ghent
Georgetown, Guyana
Geraldton, Australia
Getafe, Spain
Ghent (Gent), Belgium
Gibraltar, Gibraltar
Gikongoro, Rwanda
Girardot, Colombia
Girardota, Colombia
Girona, SpainGitega, BurundiGizo, Solomon IslandsGlasgow, United KingdomGliwice, PolandGniezno, PolandGoa and Daman, IndiaGoaso, GhanaGoiânia, BrazilGoiás, Brazil
Gokwe, Zimbabwe
Goma, Democratic Republic of the Congo
Gorakhpur, Syro-Malabar Eparchu, India
Goré, ChadGorizia, ItalyGörlitz, Germany
Goroka, Papua New Guinea
Gospić–Senj, Croatia
Governador Valadares, Brazil
Goya, Argentina
Gozo, Malta
Grajaú, BrazilGranada, SpainGranada in Colombia, Colombia
Granada, Nicaragua
Grand-Bassam, Côte d'Ivoire
Grand Falls, Canada
Grand Island, United States
Grand Rapids, United States
Graz-Seckau, Austria
Great Britain, Syro-Malabar Catholic Eparchy, England, Scotland & Wales (UK)
Great Falls-Billings, United States
Green Bay, United States
Greensburg, United States
Gregorio de Laferrere, Argentina
Grenoble–Vienne, France
Grodno, Belarus
Groningen-Leeuwarden, Netherlands
Grosseto, ItalyGrouard-McLennan, CanadaGuadalajara, MexicoGuadix, Spain
Guajará-Mirim, Brazil
Gualeguaychú, Argentina
Guanare, VenezuelaGuangzhou, ChinaGuanhães, Brazil
Guantánamo–Baracoa, Cuba
Guapi, Apostolic Vicariate, Colombia
Guarabira, Brazil
Guaranda, Ecuador
Guarapuava, Brazil
Guarda, Portugal
Guarenas, Venezuela
Guarulhos, BrazilGuatemala, GuatemalaGuaxupé, BrazilGuayaquil, EcuadorGubbio, Italy
Guide, China
Guilian (Kweilin), Apostolic prefecture, China PR
Guiratinga, Brazil
Guiyang, China
Guizeh, Coptic Catholic suffragan Eparchy, Egypt
Gulbarga, IndiaGulu, UgandaGumaca, Philippines
Gumla, India
Guntur, India
Gurk, Austria
Gurué, MozambiqueGuwahati, IndiaGwalior, India
Gwanju: see Kwanju
Gweru, Zimbabwe
Győr, Hungary

H
Haarlem-Amsterdam, NetherlandsLa Habana, San Cristóbal de, CubaHaichow (Donghai/ Haizhou), Apostolic prefecture, China PR
Haifa, Maronite, Israel
Haimen, China
Hainan, Apostolic prefecture, China PR
Hai Phòng, Vietnam
Haizhou (Donghai/ Haichow), Apostolic prefecture, China PRHajdúdorog, Hungarian Greek Catholic Archeparchy, HungaryHakha, MyanmarHalifax, CanadaHallam, United KingdomHamburg, GermanyHamhung (Hamhŭng), North Korea
Hamilton (in Bermuda), Bermuda
Hamilton, Canada
Hamilton, New ZealandHangzhou, ChinaHankou, ChinaHà Nôi, VietnamHanyang, China
Hanzhong, China
Hap-an, Myanmar
Harar, Apostolic Vicariate, EthiopiaHarare, ZimbabweHarbin, Apostolic Administration, China PR
Harbin, Russian Catholic Apostolic Exarchate, China PR
Harrisburg, United StatesHartford, United StatesHassaké-Nisibi, Syrian Catholic ?Archeparchy, SyriaHasselt, Belgium
 Havana: see (San Cristóbal de) La Habana
Hawassa (Awasa), Apostolic Vicariate, Ethiopia
Hazaribag, India
Hearst–Moosonee, Canada
Helena, United States
Helsinki, Finland
Hengzhou, ChinaHermosillo, MexicoHexham and Newcastle, United Kingdom
Hildesheim, Germany
Hinche, Haiti
Hiroshima, Japan
Ho, GhanaHo Chi Minh City, VietnamHobart, AustraliaHoima, Uganda
Holguín, Cuba
Holy Family of London, Ukrainian Catholic Eparchy for all Great Britain, UK
Homa Bay, KenyaHoms (Melkite)*, SyriaHoms (Syriac)*, SyriaHongdong, China PR
Hong Kong, China PR (autonomous status)Honiara, Solomon IslandsHonolulu, United States
Hosanna, Apostolic Vicariate, Ethiopia
Hosur (Syro-Malabar), India
Houma-Thibodaux, United States
Hradec Králové, Czech Republic
Hsinchu, Taiwan
Huacho, Peru
Huajuapan de León, Mexico
Huamachuco, Territorial Prelature, PeruHuambo, AngolaHuancavélica, PeruHuancayo, PeruHuánuco, Peru
Huautla, Territorial Prelature, Mexico
Huaraz, PeruHuế, VietnamHuehuetenango, Guatemala
Huejutla, Mexico
Huelva, Spain
Huesca, Spain
Humahuaca, Territorial Prelature, Argentina
Humaitá, Brazil
Hưng Hóa, Vietnam
HHvar-Brac-Vis, Croatia
Hwalien, Taiwan
Hwange, ZimbabweHyderabad, IndiaHyderabad, Pakistan

I
Iaşi, Romania
Iba, PhilippinesIbadan, NigeriaIbagué, ColombiaIbarra, Ecuador
Ibiza, Spain
Ica, Peru
Idah, Nigeria
Idiofa, Democratic Republic of the Congo
Idukki, India
Ifakara, Tanzania
Iglesias, Italy
Iguatu, Brazil
Ihosy, Madagascar
Ijebu-Ode, Nigeria
Ikot Ekpene, Nigeria
Ilagan, Philippines
(Iles) Saint-Pierre et Miquelon, Apostolic Vicariate, Saint-Pierre and Miquelon (French)
Ilhéus, Brazil
Iligan, Philippines
Illapel, Territorial Prelature, Chile
Ilorin, Nigeria
Imaculada Conceição in Prudentópolis, Ukrainian Catholic Eparchy, Brazil
Imola, Italy
Imperatriz, Brazil
Impfondo, Republic of the CongoImphal, IndiaImus, Philippines
Incheon (Inch'ŏn), South KoreaIndianapolis, United StatesIndias Occidentales, Titular Patriarchal See of the East Indies, vested in Goa and Daman, at the primatial see of Goa, IndiaIndore, India
Infanta, Territorial Prelature, Philippines
Ingwavuma, Apostolic Vicariate, South Africa
Inhambane, Mozambique
Inírida, Apostolic Vicariate, Colombia
Innsbruck, Austria
Inongo, Democratic Republic of the Congo
Ipameri, Brazil
Ipiales, Colombia
Ipil, Philippines
Iquique, Chile
Iquitos, Apostolic Vicariate, Peru
Irapuato, Mexico
Irecê, Brazil
Iringa, Tanzania
Irinjalakuda, India
Isangi, Democratic Republic of the Congo
Isabela, Territorial Prelature, Philippines
Ischia, Italy
Isernia-Venafro, Italy
Isiolo, Apostolic Vicariate, Kenya
Isiro–Niangara, Democratic Republic of the Congo
Iskanderiya: see Alexandria, Egypt
Islamabad–Rawalpindi, Pakistan
Islas Canarias, Spain
Ispahan, Armenian Catholic Eparchy, Iran
Issele-Uku, Nigeria
Istanbul (Latin) (formerly Constantinople), Apostolic Vicariate, Turkey
Istmina–Tadó, Colombia
Itabira–Fabriciano, Brazil
Itabuna, Brazil
Itacoatiara, Territorial Prelature, Brazil
Itaguaí, Brazil
Itaituba, Territorial Prelature, Brazil
Itanagar, India
Itapetininga, Brazil
Itapeva, Brazil
Itapipoca, Brazil
Ituiutaba, Brazil
Itumbiara, BrazilIvano-Frankivsk, Ukrainian Catholic Metropolitan Archeparchy, UkraineIvrea, Italy
Izabal, Apostolic Vicariate, Guatemala
Izcalli, MexicoIzmir, TurkeyJ
Jabalpur, India
Jaboticabal, Brazil
Jaca, Spain
Jacarezinho, Brazil
Jackson, United States
Jacmel, Haiti
Jaén, Spain
Jaén en Perú (San Francisco Javier), Apostolic Vicariate, Peru
Jaffna, Sri Lanka
Jagdalpur, Syro-Malabar Catholic Eparchy, India
Jaipur, IndiaJakarta, IndonesiaJalapa, Guatemala
Jales, Brazil
Jalingo, Nigeria
Jalpaiguri, India
Jammu-Srinagar, India
Jamshedpur, India
Janaúba, Brazil
Januária, Brazil
Jardim, BrazilJaro, PhilippinesJashpur, India
Jasikan, Ghana
Jataí, Brazil
Jayapura, Indonesia
Jefferson City, United States
Jeju: Cheju
Jelgava, Latvia
Jeonju (Chŏnju), South Korea
Jequié, Brazil
Jérémie, Haiti
Jerez de la Frontera, Spain
Jericó, Colombia
Jesi, Italy
Jesús María ((d)El Nayar), Territorial Prelature, Mexico
Jhabua, India
Jhansi, India
Jiamusi (Kiamusze), Apostolic prefecture, China PR
Jiangmen, China
Jian'ou (Jianning/ Kienning / Kienow), Apostolic prefecture, China PR
Jilin, China
Jimma–Bonga, Apostolic Vicariate, Ethiopia
Jinan, China
Jinja, Uganda
Jinotega, Nicaragua
Ji-Paraná, Brazil
Jinzhou, China
Joaçaba, BrazilJohannesburg, South AfricaJoinville, Brazil
Joliet in Illinois, United States
Joliette, Canada
Jolo, Apostolic Vicariate, Philippines Jos, NigeriaJowai, India
Juazeiro, BrazilJuba, SudanJuigalpa, Nicaragua
Juína, BrazilJuiz de Fora, BrazilJujuy, Argentina
Jalandhar, India
Juli, Territorial Prelature, Peru
Jundiaí, Brazil
Juneau, United States
(San Francisco de Asís de) Jutiapa, Guatemala
Juticalpa, Honduras

K
Kabale, Uganda
Kabankalan, Philippines
Kabgayi, Rwanda
Kabinda, Democratic Republic of the Congo
Kabwe, ZambiaKaduna, NigeriaKafanchan, Nigeria
Kaga–Bandoro, Central African Republic
Kagoshima, Japan
Kahama, TanzaniaKaifeng, ChinaKaišiadorys, Lithuania
Kakamega, Kenya
Kalamazoo, United States
Kalay, Burma
Kalemie–Kirungu, Democratic Republic of the Congo
Kalibo, Philippines
Kalisz, PolandKalocsa–Kecskemét, HungaryKalookan, Philippines
Kalyan, India
Kamichlié, Armenian Catholic Eparchy at Qamishli, Syria
Kamina, Democratic Republic of the Congo
Kamloops, CanadaKampala, UgandaKamyanets-Podilsky, Ukraine
Kamyanets-Podilskyi, Ukrainian Catholic Eparchy, UkraineKananga, Democratic Republic of the CongoKandi, Benin
Kandy, Sri Lanka
Kangding, China
Kanjirapally, Syro-Malabar Catholic Eparchy, India
Kankan, Guinea
Kannur, India
Kano, NigeriaKansas City, United StatesKansas City-Saint Joseph, United States
Kaohsiung, Taiwan
Kaolack, Senegal
Kaposvár, Hungary
Kara, TogoKarachi, PakistanKaraganda, Kazakhstan
Karonga, Malawi
Karwar, IndiaKasama, ZambiaKasana–Luweero, Uganda
Kasese, Uganda
Kasongo, Democratic Republic of the Congo
Katiola, Côte d'IvoireKatowice, PolandKaunas, LithuaniaKavieng, Papua New Guinea
Kaya, Burkina Faso
Kayes, Mali
Keetmanshoop, NamibiaKeewatin-Le Pas, CanadaKeimoes–Upington, South Africa
Kenema, Sierra Leone
Kenge, Democratic Republic of the Congo
Kengtung, Myanmar
Keningau, Malaysia
Kerema, Papua New Guinea
Keren (Eritrean Catholic epearchy), Eritrea
Kericho, KenyaKerkūk (Chaldean archeparchy), IraqKerry, Ireland
Keta-Akatsi, Ghana
Ketapang, Indonesia
Khadki, Saint Ephrem of -, Syro-Malankara Catholic Exarchate, India
Khammam, India
Khandwa, India
Kharkiv, Ukrainian Catholic Archiepiscopal Exarchate, Ukraine 
Kharkiv–Zaporizhia, UkraineKhartoum, SudanKhulna, Bangladesh
Khunti, India
Kiamusze (Jiamusi), Apostolic prefecture, China PR
Kiayi, Taiwan
Kibungo, Rwanda
Kidapawan, Philippines
Kielce, Poland
Kienning (Jianning/ Jian'ou / Kienow), Apostolic prefecture, China PR
(Kiev, Kiew: see Kyiv, Ukraine)Kigali, RwandaKigoma, Tanzania
Kikwit, Democratic Republic of the Congo
Kildare and Leighlin, Ireland
Killala, Ireland
Killaloe, Ireland
Kilmore, Ireland & United Kingdom
Kilwa–Kasenga, Democratic Republic of the Congo
Kimbe, Papua New Guinea
Kimberley, South Africa
Kindu, Democratic Republic of the CongoKingston, CanadaKingston in Jamaica, JamaicaKingstown, Saint Vincent and Grenadines
Kinkala, Republic of the CongoKinshasa, Democratic Republic of the CongoKisangani, Democratic Republic of the CongoKisantu, Democratic Republic of the Congo
Kisii, KenyaKisumu, KenyaKitale, Kenya
Kitui, Kenya
Kiyinda–Mityana, Uganda
Klerksdorp, South Africa
Knoxville, United States
København: see Copenhagen
Koforidua, Ghana
Kohima, India
Kokstad, South Africa
Kolda, Senegal
Kole, Democratic Republic of the Congo
Kolomyia, Ukrainian Catholic Eparchy, Ukraine
Kolwezi, Democratic Republic of the Congo
Kompong Cham, Apostolic prefecture, Cambodia
Kondoa, Tanzania
Kongolo, Democratic Republic of the Congo
Konongo–Mampong, Ghana
Kontagora, Nigeria
Kontum, Vietnam
Koper, SloveniaKorhogo, Côte d'IvoireKošice, SlovakiaKošice, Slovak Catholic Eparchy, Slovakia
Koszalin-Kołobrzeg, PolandKota Kinabalu, MalaysiaKothamangalam, India
Kotido, Uganda
Kotor, Montenegro
Kottapuram, India
Kottar, IndiaKottayam, IndiaKoudougou, Burkina FasoKoupéla, Burkina FasoKpalimé, TogoKraków, PolandKrishnagar, India
Križevci (Croatian Catholic eparchy), Croatia
Krk, Croatia
Kroonstad, South Africa
Krym (Crimea), at Simferopol, Ukrainian Catholic Archiepiscopal Exarchate, UkraineKuala Lumpur, MalaysiaKuching, MalaysiaKumasi, GhanaKumbakonam, India
Kumba, Cameroon
Kundiawa, Papua New GuineaKunming, ChinaKupang, IndonesiaKurnool, India
Kurunegala, Sri Lanka
Kuzhithurai, IndiaKwangju (Gwanju), South KoreaKweilin (Guilian), Apostolic prefecture, China PR
Kwito-Bié, AngolaKyiv (Kiev, Kiew), Ukrainian Catholic (proper Metropolitanate of the Major Archdiocese), UkraineKyiv–Halych (at Kiev, Kiew), the Ukrainian Catholic Major Archdiocese, UkraineKyiv–Zhytomyr, Ukraine
Kyoto, Japan
Kyrgyzstan, Apostolic Administration, at Bishkek, in and for all Kyrgyzstan

L
La Crosse, United States
Lábrea, Territorial Prelature, Brazil
La Dorada-Guaduas, Colombia
Lae, Papua New Guinea
Lafayette in Indiana, United States
Lafayette in Louisiana, United States
Lafia, Nigeria
Lages, Brazil
Laghouat, AlgeriaLagos, NigeriaLa Guaira, VenezuelaLahore, PakistanLai, Chad
Lake Charles, United States
Lamego, Portugal
Lamezia Terme, Italy
Lancaster, United KingdomLanciano-Ortona, ItalyLạng Sơn and Cao Bằng, Vietnam
Langres, France
Lansing, United States
Lanusei, ItalyLanzhou, ChinaLaoag, Philippines
Laohekou, ChinaLa Paz, BoliviaLa Paz en la Baja California Sur, MexicoLa Plata, ArgentinaL'Aquila, ItalyLarantuka, Indonesia
Laredo, United States
La Rioja, Argentina
La Rochelle, France
Las Cruces, United StatesLa Serena, ChileLashio, Myanmar
La Spezia–Sarzana–Brugnato, Italy
Las Vegas, United States
Latacunga, Ecuador
Latakia, Maronite Eparchy, SyriaLatakia (Melkites), Syria
Latina–Terracina–Sezze–Priverno, Italy
Lausanne, Genève et Fribourg, Switzerland
Laval, France
La Vega, Dominican RepublicLecce, ItalyLeeds, United Kingdom
Legazpi, Philippines
Legnica, Poland
Le Havre, France
Leiria–Fátima, Portugal
Le Mans, France
León, SpainLeón, MexicoLeón, Nicaragua
Leopoldina, Brazil
Le Puy-en-Velay, France
Leribe, Lesotho
Les Cayes, Haiti
Les Gonaïves, Haiti
Leticia, Apostolic Vicariate, Colombia
Lexington, United States
Lezhë, Albania
Líbano-Honda, Colombia
Libmanan, PhilippinesLibreville, GabonLichinga, Mozambique
Liège, Belgium
Liepāja, LatviaLille, FranceLilongwe, MalawiLima, PeruLimburg, Germany
Limeira, Brazil
Limerick, Ireland
Limoeiro do Norte, Brazil
Limoges, France
Limón, Costa Rica
Linares, Mexico
Linares, Chile
Lincoln, United States
Lindi, TanzaniaLingayen-Dagupan, PhilippinesLins, Brazil
Linz, AustriaLipa, PhilippinesLira, Uganda
Lisala, Democratic Republic of the CongoLisbon, PortugalLishui, China
Lismore, Australia
Litoměřice, Czech Republic
Little Rock, United StatesLiverpool, United Kingdom & Isle of ManLivingstone, Zambia
Livorno, Italy
Livramento de Nossa Senhora, BrazilLjubljana, SloveniaLleida, Spain
Locri-Gerace, Italy
Lodi, Italy
Lodwar, KenyaŁódź, PolandLoikaw, Myanmar
Loja, Ecuador
Lokoja, Nigeria
Lokossa, Benin
Lolo, Democratic Republic of the Congo
Lomas de Zamora, ArgentinaLomé, TogoŁomża, Poland
London, Canada
London, Holy Family of, Ukrainian Catholic Eparchy for all Great Britain, UKLondrina, BrazilLong Xuyên, Vietnam
Lorena, Brazil
Loreto, Territorial Prelature, ItalyLos Altos, Quetzaltenango–Totonicapán, GuatemalaLos Ángeles, ChileLos Angeles, United StatesLos Teques, ChileLouisville, United StatesŁowicz, Poland
Luoyang, China
Lu'an, ChinaLuanda, AngolaLuang Prabang, Apostolic Vicariate, LaosLubango, AngolaLubbock, United StatesLublin, PolandLubumbashi, Democratic Republic of the CongoLucca, ItalyLucena, Philippines
Lucera-Troia, Italy
Lucknow, India
Luçon, France
Luebo, Democratic Republic of the Congo
Lugano, Switzerland
Lugazi, Uganda
Lugo, Spain
Lugoj, Romania
Luiza, Democratic Republic of the Congo
Lulong, China
Lungro, Italo-Albanese Eparchy, Italy
Luoyang, China
Lurín, PeruLusaka, ZambiaLutsk (Latin), Ukraine
Lutsk, Ukrainian Catholic Archiepiscopal Exarchate, Ukraine Luxembourg, LuxembourgLuz, Brazil
Luziânia, BrazilLviv (Armenian), UkraineLviv (Latin), UkraineLviv, Ukrainian Catholic Metropolitanate, UkraineLwena, AngolaLyon, France|
M
Maasin, Philippines
Macau, Macao
Macapá, BrazilMaceió, BrazilMacerata–Tolentino–Recanati–Cingoli–Treia, Italy
Machakos, Kenya
Machala, Ecuador
Machiques, Venezuela
Mackenzie-Fort Smith, CanadaMadang, Papua New GuineaMadison, United StatesMadras and Mylapore, IndiaMadrid, SpainMadurai, IndiaMagangué, Colombia
Magdeburg, Germany
Mahagi-Nioka, Democratic Republic of the Congo
Mahajanga, Madagascar
Mahenge, Tanzania
Maiduguri, Nigeria
Mainz, Germany
Maitland-Newcastle, Australia
Majorca, Spain
Makokou, Apostolic Vicariate, GabonMakassar, IndonesiaMakeni, Sierra Leone
Makurdi, NigeriaMalabo, Equatorial GuineaMálaga, Spain
Málaga-Soatá, Colombia
Malakal, Sudan
Malang, IndonesiaMalanje, AngolaMalabalay, Philippines
Maldonado-Punta del Este, Uruguay
Maliana, Timor-Leste
Malindi, Kenya
Malolos, PhilippinesMalta, MaltaMamfe, Cameroon
Man, Côte d'Ivoire
Manado, IndonesiaManagua, NicaraguaMananthavady (Syro-Malabar), India
Mananjary, MadagascarManaus, BrazilManchester, United StatesMandalay, MyanmarMandeville, Jamaica
Mandya (Syro-Malabar), IndiaManfredonia–Vieste–San Giovanni Rotondo, ItalyManga, Burkina Faso
Mangochi, Malawi
Mangalore, India
Mangochi, MalawiManila, PhilippinesManizales, ColombiaMannar, Sri Lanka
Manokwari-Sorong, Indonesia
Manono, Democratic Republic of the Congo
Mansa, Zambia
Mantova, Italy
Manzini, Swaziland
Mao-Monte Cristi, Dominican RepublicMaputo, MozambiqueMarabá, BrazilMaracaibo, VenezuelaMaracay, Venezuela
Mar Addai of Toronto, Chaldean Catholic eparchy, Canada
Maradi, Niger
Marajó, Territorial Prelature, Brazil
Maralal, Kenya
Maramureş, Romania
Marawi, Territorial Prelature, Philippines
Marbel, Philippines
Mar del Plata, ArgentinaMaribor, SloveniaMargarita, VenezuelaMariana, BrazilMariannhill, South Africa
Marília, BrazilMaringá, BrazilMaroua-Mokolo, Cameroon
Marquette, United States
Marsabit, KenyaMarseille, FranceMarshall Islands, Apostolic prefecture, Marshall Islands
Marthandom (Syro-Malankara), IndiaMary Most Holy in Astana, KazakhstanMasaka, Uganda
Masan, South KoreaMaseru, LesothoMassa Carrara-Pontremoli, Italy
Massa Marittima-Piombino, Italy
Masvingo, Zimbabwe
Matadi, Democratic Republic of the Congo
Matagalpa, Nicaragua
Matamoros, Mexico
Matanzas, Cuba
Matehuala, MexicoMatera-Irsina, ItalyMati, Philippines
Maturín, Venezuela
Maumere, Indonesia
Mavelikara (Syro-Malankara), India
Mawlamyine, Myanmar
Mayagüez, Puerto Rico
Mazara del Vallo, Italy
Mazatlán, Mexico
Mbaïki, Central African Republic
Mbalmayo, CameroonMbandaka-Bikoro, Democratic Republic of the CongoMbanza Congo, AngolaMbarara, UgandaMbeya, TanzaniaMbinga, Tanzania
Mbujimayi, Democratic Republic of the Congo
Mbulu, Tanzania
Meath, Ireland
Meaux, FranceMechelen-Brussel, BelgiumMedan, IndonesiaMedellín, ColombiaMeerut, India
Meki, Apostolic Vicariate, Ethiopia
Melaka-Johor, MalaysiaMelbourne, AustraliaMelbourne, Saints Peter and Paul of, Ukrainian Catholic Eparchy, Australia
Melfi-Rapolla-Venosa, Italy
Melipilla, Chile
Melo, Uruguay
Memphis, United States
Mende, France
Méndez, Apostolic Vicariate, Ecuador
Mendi, Papua New GuineaMendoza, ArgentinaMenevia, United Kingdom
Menongue, Angola
Menorca, SpainMerauke, IndonesiaMercedes, UruguayMercedes-Luján, ArgentinaMérida, VenezuelaMérida-Badajoz, SpainMerlo-Moreno, Argentina
Meru, KenyaMessina-Lipari-Santa Lucia del Mela, ItalyMetuchen, United States
Metz, France
Mexicali, MexicoMexico, MexicoMiami, United StatesMiao, India
Miarinarivo, Madagascar
Middlesbrough, United KingdomMilano, ItalyMileto-Nicotera-Tropea, ItalyMilwaukee, United StatesMinas, Uruguay
Mindelo, Cape Verde
Minna, NigeriaMinsk–Mohilev, BelarusMinya, Egypt
Miracema do Tocantins, Brazil
Miri, Malaysia
Mississauga (Syro-Malabar eparchy), Canada
Mission de France at Pontigny, Territorial Prelature, France
Misurata, Apostolic prefecture, Libya
Mitú, Apostolic Vicariate, Colombia
Mixes, Territorial Prelature, MexicoMobile, United StatesMocoa-Sibundoy, ColombiaModena-Nonantola, ItalyMogadiscio, Somalia
Mogi das Cruzes, Brazil
Mohale's Hoek, Lesotho
Molegbe, Democratic Republic of the Congo
Molfetta-Ruvo-Giovinazzo-Terlizzi, ItalyMombasa, KenyaMonaco, MonacoMoncton, CanadaMondoñedo–Ferrol, Spain
Mondovì, Italy
Mongo, Apostolic Vicariate, Chad
Mongomo, Equatorial Guinea
Mongu, ZambiaMonreale, ItalyMonrovia, LiberiaMontauban, France
Montego Bay, Jamaica
Montelíbano, Colombia
Montenegro, Brazil
Montepulciano-Chiusi-Pienza, Italy
Monterey in California, United States
Montería, ColombiaMonterrey, MexicoMontes Claros, BrazilMontevideo, UruguayMont-Laurier, CanadaMontpellier, FranceMontreal, CanadaMonze, Zambia
Mopti, Mali
Moramanga, MadagascarMorelia, MexicoMorogoro, Tanzania
Morombe, Madagascar
Morón, Argentina
Morondava, Madagascar
Moroto, Uganda
Moshi, Tanzania
Mossoró, BrazilMosul (Chaldean), IraqMosul (Syriac), Iraq
Mostar–Duvno, Bosnia and Herzegovina
Most Holy Trinity in Almaty, KazakhstanMother of God at Moscow, RussiaMotherwell, United Kingdom
Mouila, Gabon
Moulins, France
Moundou, ChadMount Hagen, Papua New GuineaMoyobamba, Territorial Prelature, Peru
 Mpanda, Tanzania
Mpika, Zambia
Mtwara, Tanzania
Mukachevo (Ruthenian), Ukraine
Mukachevo (Latin), Ukraine
Multan, PakistanMunich and Freising, GermanyMünster, Germany
Murang'a, Kenya
Murska Sobota, Slovenia
Musoma, Tanzania
Mutare, Zimbabwe
Muvattupuzha (Syro-Malankara eparchy), India
Muyinga, Burundi
Muzaffarpur, IndiaMwanza, TanzaniaMweka, Democratic Republic of the Congo
Myitkyina, Myanmar
Mymensingh, Bangladesh
Mysore, India
Mỹ Tho, Vietnam
Mzuzu, Malawi

N
Nacala, MozambiqueNagasaki, JapanNagoya, JapanNagpur, IndiaNaha, JapanNairobi, KenyaNakhon Ratchasima, Thailand
Nakhon Sawan, Thailand
Nakuru, Kenya
Nalgonda, IndiaNampula, MozambiqueNamur, BelgiumNanchang, ChinaNancheng, China
Nancy, FranceNanjing, ChinaNanlong, ChinaNanning, ChinaNanterre, France
Nantes, France
Nanyang, ChinaNapoli (Naples), ItalyNapo, Apostolic Vicariate, Ecuador
Nardò – Gallipoli, Italy
Nashik, India
Nashville, United StatesNassau, BahamasNatal, BrazilNatitingou, Benin
Naval, Philippines
Naviraí, Brazil
Navrongo–Bolgatanga, GhanaNaxos–Andros–Tinos–Mykonos, GreeceNayar, Jesús María del, Territorial Prelature, Mexico
Nazaré, Brazil
Ndalatando, Angola
N'Dali, BeninN'Djamena, ChadNdola, Zambia
Nebbi, Uganda
Neiva, Colombia
Nekemte, Apostolic Vicariate, Ethiopia
Nellore, India
Nelson, Canada
Nepal, Apostolic Vicariate (in Kathmandu), Nepal
Neuquén, Argentina
Nevers, FranceNewark, United StatesNew Orleans, United StatesNew Ulm, United States
New Westminster, Canada
New Westminster, Ukrainian Catholic Eparchy, CanadaNew York, United StatesNeyyattinkara, India
Nezahualcóyotl, Mexico
Ngaoundéré, Cameroon
Ngong, Kenya
Ngozi, Burundi
Nha Trang, VietnamNiamey, NigerNice, France
Nicolet, Canada
'Nicopolis, Bulgaria
Nicosia, Italy
Niigata, Japan
Nikopol, Bulgaria
Nîmes, France
Ningbo, China
Ningxia, China
Ningyaun, ChinaNiterói, BrazilNitra, Slovakia
Njombe, Tanzania
Nkayi, Republic of the Congo
Nkongsamba, Cameroon
Nnewi, Nigeria
Nocera Inferiore-Sarno, Italy
Nogales, Mexico
Nola, Italy
Nongstoin, India
Northampton, United Kingdom
Northern Arabia, Apostolic Vicariate, in Kuwait City, Kuwait
Norwich, United States
Nossa Senhora do Líbano em São Paulo, Maronite Eparchy, Brazil
Nossa Senhora do Paraíso em São Paulo (Melkite), Brazil
Noto, Italy
Notre-Dame du Liban de Paris, Maronite Eparchy, France
Nottingham, United Kingdom
Nouakchott, MauritaniaNouméa, New CaledoniaNouna, Burkina Faso
Nova Friburgo, Brazil
Nova Iguaçu, Brazil
Novaliches, Philippines
Novara, Italy
Novo Hamburgo, Brazil
Novo Mesto, Slovenia
Nsukka, Nigeria
Nuestra Señora de la Altagracia en Higüey, Dominican Republic
Nuestra Señora de los Mártires del Líbano en México (Maronite), Maronite*, Mexico
Nuestra Señora del Paraíso en México (Melkite)*, MexicoNueva Pamplona, ColombiaNueva Segovia, PhilippinesNueve de Julio, Argentina
Nuevo Casas Grandes, Mexico
Nuevo Laredo, Mexico
Ñuflo de Chávez, Apostolic Vicariate, Bolivia
Nuoro, Italy
Nyahururu, KenyaNyeri, KenyaNyundo, Rwanda
N'Zérékoré, Guinea

O
Oakland, United States
Obala, Cameroon
Oberá, Argentina
Óbidos, Brazil
Obuasi, Ghana
Ocaña, Colombia
Odessa, Ukrainian Catholic Archiepiscopal Exarchate, Ukraine 
Odessa–Simferopol (Latin), Ukraine
Odienné, Côte d'Ivoire
Oeiras, Brazil
Ogdensburg, United States
Ogoja, Nigeria
Oita, Japan
Okigwe, NigeriaOklahoma City, United StatesOlinda e Recife, BrazilOliveira, BrazilOlomouc, Czech RepublicOmaha, United StatesOndjiva, Angola
Ondo, NigeriaOnitsha, NigeriaOotacamund, India
Opole, Poland
Oppido Mamertina-Palmi, Italy
Oradea Mare, Romania
Oran, Algeria
Orán, Argentina
Orange, United States
Orense, Spain
Oria, Italy
Orihuela–Alicante, SpainOristano, ItalyOrizaba, Mexico
Orlando, United States
Orléans, France
Orlu, Nigeria
Oruro, Bolivia
Orvieto-Todi, ItalyOsaka, JapanOsasco, Brazil
Oslo, Norway
Osma-Soria, Spain
Osnabrück, Germany
Osogbo, Nigeria
Osório, Brazil
Osorno, Chile
Ossory, Ireland
Ostia, Italy
Ostrava-Opava, Czech RepublicOtranto, ItalyOttawa, CanadaOtukpo, NigeriaOuagadougou, Burkina FasoOuahigouya, Burkina Faso
Oudtshoorn, South Africa
Ouesso, Republic of the Congo
Ourinhos, Brazil
Our Lady of Deliverance of Newark, United States
Our Lady of Lebanon of Los Angeles, Maronite Eparchy*, United States
Our Lady of Nareg in Glendale, Armenian Catholic, United StatesOviedo, SpainOwando, Republic of the Congo
Owensboro, United StatesOwerri, NigeriaOyem, Gabon
Oyo, NigeriaOzamiz, PhilippinesOzieri, Italy

P
Padang, IndonesiaPaderborn, GermanyPadova, Italy
Pagadian, Philippines
Paisley, United Kingdom
Pakse (Paksé), Apostolic Vicariate, Laos
Pala, Chad
Palai, India
Palangkaraya, Indonesia
Palayamkottai, IndiaPalembang, IndonesiaPalencia, SpainPalermo, ItalyPalestrina, Italy
Palghat, Syro-Malabar Eparchy, India
Palmares, BrazilPalmas, BrazilPalmas–Francisco Beltrão, Brazil
Palm Beach, United States
Palmeira dos Índios, Brazil
Palmerston North, New Zealand
Palmira, ColombiaPalo, PhilippinesPamiers, FrancePamplona y Tudela, SpainPanamá, PanamaPando, Apostolic Vicariate, Bolivia
Panevėžys, Lithuania
Pankshin, Nigeria
Pannonhalma, Territorial Abbacy, Hungary
Paoking (Baoqing, Shaoyang), Apostolic prefecture, China PR
Papantla, MexicoPapeete, French Polynesia (& Pitcairn Islands)Paracatu, BrazilParaíba, BrazilParakou, BeninParamaribo, SurinameParaná, ArgentinaParanaguá, Brazil
Parañaque, Philippines
Paranavaí, Brazil
Parassala, Syro-Malankara Catholic Eparchy, India
Parintins, BrazilParis, FranceParma, Italy
Parma (Ruthenian), United States
Parma (Ukrainian), United States
Parnaíba, Brazil
Parral, Mexico
Parramatta, Australia
Pasig, Philippines
Passaic (Ruthenian)*, Eparchy United States
Passau, GermanyPasso Fundo, BrazilPasto, Colombia
Paterson, United States
Pathanamthitta, Syro-Malankara Catholic Eparchy, India
Pathein, MyanmarPatna, IndiaPatos, Brazil
Patos de Minas, Brazil
Patti, Italy
Paulo Afonso, Brazil
Pavia, Italy
Pécs, Hungary
Pekhon, MyanmarPelotas, BrazilPelplin, Poland
Pemba, Mozambique
Pembroke, Canada
Penang, Malaysia
Penedo, Brazil
Penonomé, Panama
Pensacola-Tallahassee, United States
Peoria, United States
Pereira, Colombia
Périgueux, France
Perpignan-Elne, FrancePerth, AustraliaPerugia–Città della Pieve, ItalyPesaro, ItalyPescara-Penne, ItalyPescia, Italy
Pesqueira, Brazil
Petare, Venezuela
Peterborough, CanadaPetra and Philadelphia, Melkite*, JordanPetrolina, Brazil
Petrópolis, Brazil
Phan Thiết, Vietnam
Phát Diêm, VietnamPhiladelphia (Latin Church), United StatesPhiladelphia (Ukrainian Catholic), United StatesPhnom Penh, Apostolic Vicariate, Cambodia
Phoenix (Latin Church), United States
Phoenix (Ruthenian*), United States
Phú Cường, Vietnam
Piacenza-Bobbio, Italy
Piana degli Albanesi, Italo-Albanese Eparchy, Italy
Piazza Armerina, Italy
Picos, Brazil
Piedras Negras, Mexico
Pietersburg, South Africa
Pilcomayo, Apostolic Vicariate, Paraguay
Pinar del Río, Cuba
Pinerolo, Italy
Pingliang, Cuba
Pinheiro, Brazil
Pinsk, Belarus
Piracicaba, BrazilPisa, ItalyPistoia, Italy
Pitigliano-Sovana-Orbetello, Italy
Pittsburgh (Latin Church), United StatesPittsburgh (Ruthenian Catholic Byzantine), United StatesPiura, PeruPlasencia, Spain
Płock, Poland
Plymouth, United Kingdom
Plzeň, Czech Republic
Plymouth, United States
Pointe-à-Pitre: see united see Basse-Terre(-Pointe-à-Pitre)
Pointe-Noire, Republic of the CongoPoitiers, FrancePompei aka Beatissima Vergine Maria del SS.mo Rosario (Blessed Virgin of the Most Sacred Rosary), Territorial Prelature, Brazil
Ponce, Puerto RicoPondicherry and Cuddalore, IndiaPonta de Pedras, Brazil
Ponta Grossa, BrazilPontianak, IndonesiaPontigny (Mission de France), Territorial Prelature, France
Pontoise, France
Poona, IndiaPopayán, ColombiaPopokabaka, Democratic Republic of the Congo
Poreč i Pula, Croatia
Portalegre–Castelo Branco, PortugalPort-au-Prince, HaitiPort-Bergé, Madagascar
Port Blair, India
Port-de-Paix, Haiti
Port Elizabeth, South Africa
Port-Gentil, Gabon
Port Hartcourt, NigeriaPortland in Oregon, United StatesPortland in Maine, United States
Port-Louis, MauritiusPort Moresby, Papua New GuineaPorto, PortugalPorto Alegre, BrazilPort of Spain, Trinidad and TobagoPorto Nacional, Brazil
Porto Novo, Benin
Porto-Santa Rufina, ItalyPorto Velho, BrazilPortoviejo, EcuadorPort Pirie, Australia
Portsmouth, United Kingdom
Port Victoria, Seychelles
Port-Vila, Vanuatu
Posadas, ArgentinaPotenza-Muro Lucano-Marsico Nuovo, ItalyPotosí, BoliviaPouso Alegre, BrazilPožega, CroatiaPoznań, PolandPozzuoli, ItalyPrague (Praha), Czech RepublicPrato, Italy
Presidente Prudente, BrazilPrešov, Slovak Catholic Archeparchy, Metropolitanate sui juris, SlovakiaPretoria, South AfricaPrince-Albert, Canada
Prince George, Canada
Prizren-Priština, Kosovo
Propriá, Brazil
Providence, United States
Prudentópolis, Imaculada Conceição in -, Ukrainian Catholic Eparchy, BrazilPrzemyśl, PolandPrzemyśl-Warszawa (Ukrainian Catholic), PolandPucallpa, Apostolic Vicariate, PeruPuebla de los Angeles, MexicoPueblo, United States
Puerto Cabello, Venezuela
Puerto Escondido, Mexico
Puerto Iguazú, Argentina
Puerto Ayacucho, Apostolic Vicariate, Veneuzuela
Puerto Carreño, Apostolic Vicariate, Colombia
Puerto Gaitán, Apostolic Vicariate, Colombia
Leguízamo–Solano, Apostolic Vicariate, Colombia
Puerto Maldonado, Apostolic Vicariate, PeruPuerto Montt, ChilePuerto Plata, Dominican Republic
Puerto Princesa, Apostolic Vicariate, Philippines 
Punalur, India
Puno, Peru
Punta Arenas, Chile
Puntarenas, Costa Rica
Punto Fijo, Venezuela
Puqi, China
Purnea, India
Purwokerto, Indonesia
Pusan (Busan), South Korea
Puthur, Syro-Malankara Catholic Eparchy, India
Puyo, Apostolic Vicariate, Ecuador
Pyay, Myanmar
Pyongyang (P'yŏng-yang), North Korea

Q
 Qacha's Nek, Lesotho
 Qizhou, China
 Qingdao, ChinaQuebec, Canada Queenstown, South Africa
 Quelimane, Mozambique
 Querétaro, Mexico
Quetta, Apostolic Vicariate, Pakistan
 Quibdó, Colombia
 Quiché, Guatemala
 Quilmes, Argentina
 Quilon, India
 Quimper-Léon, FranceQuito, Ecuador Quixadá, Brazil
 Quy Nhơn, Vietnam

RRabat, MoroccoRabaul, Papua New GuineaRadom, Poland
Rafaela, Argentina
Ragusa, Italy
Raiganj, India
Raigarh, IndiaRaipur, IndiaRajkot, India
Rajshahi, Bangladesh
Raleigh, United States
Ramanathapuram, India
Rancagua, ChileRanchi, IndiaRangoon (Yangon), BurmaRaphoe, Ireland
Rapid City, United States
Rarotonga, Cook Islands
Ratchaburi, Thailand
Ratnapura, Sri LankaRavenna-Cervia, ItalyRayagada, India
Reconquista, Argentina
Regensburg, GermanyReggio Calabria-Bova, ItalyReggio Emilia-Guastalla, ItalyRegina, CanadaRegistro, Brazil
Rehe, ChinaReims, FranceRennes, FranceReno, United StatesResistencia, ArgentinaRequena, Apostolic Vicariate, Peru
Reyes, Apostolic Vicariate, Bolivia
Reykjavík, Iceland
Rēzekne–Aglona, LatviaRhodos, GreeceRibeirão Preto, BrazilRichmond, United States
Rieti, ItalyRiga, LatviaRijeka, CroatiaRimini, ItalyRimouski, CanadaRiobamba, Ecuador
Rio Branco, Brazil
Rio do Sul, Brazil
Río Gallegos, Argentina
Rio Grande, Brazil
Riohacha, Colombia
Robe, Apostolic prefecture, Ethiopia
Rochester, United States
Rockford, United States
Rockhampton, Australia
Rockville Centre, United States
Rodez, France
Rodrigues, Apostolic Vicariate, Mauritius
Roermond, Netherlands
Romblon, PhilippinesRome, ItalyRondonópolis, Brazil
Roraima, BrazilRosario, ArgentinaRoseau, DominicaRossano-Cariati, ItalyRottenburg-Stuttgart, Germany
Rotterdam, NetherlandsRouen, FranceRourkela, India
Rouyn-Noranda, Canada
Rožňava, Slovakia
Rrëshen, Albania
Rubiataba–Mozarlândia, Brazil
Ruhengeri, Rwanda
Rulenge, Tanzania
Rumbek, Sudan
Rundu, Apostolic Vicariate, Namibia
Rustenburg, South Africa
Rutana, Burundi
Ruteng, Indonesia
Ruy Barbosa, Brazil
Ruyigi, Burundi
Rzeszów, Poland

S
Sabina-Poggio Mirteto, Italy
Sacramento, United States
Sagar, India
Saginaw, United States
Saida (Maronite), LebanonSaida, LebanonSt Andrews and Edinburgh, United KingdomSt. Augustine, United StatesSaint Boniface, CanadaSaint-Brieuc, France
Saint Catharines, Canada
Saint-Claude, France
Saint Clement at Saratov, Russia
Saint Cloud, United States
Saint-Denis, France
Saint-Denis-de-La Réunion, Réunion (French)
Saint-Dié, France
Sainte-Anne-de-la-Pocatière, Canada
Sainte-Croix-de-Paris, Armenian Catholic Apostolic Eparchy, France, exempt
Saint Ephrem of Khadki (Syro-Malankara), Exachate, India
Saint-Étienne, France
Saint-Flour, France
Saint George in Canton, Romanian Catholic Eparchy, United States
Saint George's in Grenada, Grenada
Saint Helena, Ascension Island and Tristan da Cunha, Mission sui juris, Saint Helena, Ascension Island and Tristan da Cunha (UK)
Saint-Hyacinthe, Canada
Saint-Jean-Longueuil, Canada
Saint-Jérôme, Canada
Saint John Chrysostom of Gurgaon, Syro-Malankara Catholic Eparchy, India
Saint John, New Brunswick, Canada
Saint John's–Bassetere, the CaribbeanSt. John's, Newfoundland, CanadaSaint Joseph at Irkutsk, RussiaSt. Louis, United StatesSaint-Louis du Sénégal, Senegal
Saint-Maron de Montréal, Maronite Eparchy, Canada
Saint Maron of Brooklyn, Maronite Eparchy, United States
Saint Maron of Sydney, Maronite Eparchy, Australia
Saint Michael's of Sydney, Melkite Greek*, Australia
Saint Nicholas of Chicago, Ukrainian Catholic Eparchy, United States
Saint Nicholas of Ruski Krstur, Greek Catholic Eparchy, Serbia
Saint Paul, Alberta, CanadaSaint Paul and Minneapolis, United StatesSaint Peter the Apostle of El Cajon, Chaldean Catholic Eparchy, United States
Saint Petersburg, United States
Saint-Sauveur de Montréal, Melkite Greek Catholic*, Canada
Saints Cyril and Methodius of Toronto, Slovak Greek Catholic Eparchy, Canada
Saints Peter and Paul of Melbourne, Ukrainian Catholic Eparchy, Australia
Saint Thomas, at Charlotte Amalie, U.S. Virgin Islands
Saint Thomas the Apostle of Chicago, Syro-Malabar Catholic Eparchy, United States
Saint Thomas the Apostle of Detroit, Chaldean Catholic* Eparchy, United States
Saint Thomas the Apostle of Sydney, Chaldean Catholic Eparchy, Australia
|
Saitama, Japan
Sakania–Kipushi, Democratic Republic of the Congo
Salamanca, Spain
Sale, Australia
Salem, IndiaSalerno-Campagna-Acerno, ItalySalford, United Kingdom
Salgueiro, Brazil
Salina, United StatesSalmas, Chaldean Catholic Archeparchy (Archdiocese), IranSalta, ArgentinaSaltillo, Mexico
Salt Lake City, United States
Salto, Uruguay
Saluzzo, ItalySalzburg, AustriaSamarinda, IndonesiaSambalpur, India
Sambir-Drohobych, Ukrainian Catholic Eparchy, Ukraine
Same, TanzaniaSamoa-Apia, SamoaSamoa-Pago Pago, American Samoa
San, Mali
San Andrés y Providencia, Apostolic Vicariate, Colombia
San Andrés Tuxtla, Mexico
San Angelo, United StatesSan Antonio, United StatesSan Benedetto del Tronto-Ripatransone-Montalto, Italy
San Bernardino, United States
San Bernardo, Chile
San Carlos, Philippines
San Carlos de Ancud, Chile
San Carlos de Bariloche, Argentina
San Carlos de Venezuela, Venezuela
San Charbel en Buenos Aires*, Eparchy, Argentina(San Cristóbal de) la Habana, CubaSan Cristóbal de La Laguna, Spain
San Cristóbal de las Casas, Mexico
San Cristóbal de Venezuela, Venezuela
Sandakan, Malaysia
Sandhurst, Australia
Santo Domingo, Ecuador
San Diego, United States
Sandomierz, Poland
Santo Domingo, Ecuador
San Felipe, Chile
San Felipe, VenezuelaSan Fernando, PhilippinesSan Fernando de Apure, Venezuela
San Fernando de La Union, Philippines
San Francisco, ArgentinaSan Francisco, United StatesSan Francisco de Macorís, Dominican Republic
San Francisco Javier (Jaén en Perú), Apostolic Vicariate, Peru
San Francisco de Asís de Jutiapa, Guatemala
Sanggau, Indonesia
Sangmélima, Cameroon
San Gregorio de Narek en Buenos Aires, Armenian Catholic*, Argentina
San Ignacio de Velasco, Bolivia
San Isidro, Argentina
San Isidro de El General, Costa Rica
San Jacinto, Ecuador
San José de Amazonas, Apostolic Vicariate, Peru
San Jose in Mindoro, Apostolic Vicariate, Philippines 
San Jose in Nueva Ecija, Philippines
San Jose de Antique, PhilippinesSan José de Costa Rica, Costa RicaSan José del Guaviare, Colombia
San José de Mayo, Uruguay
San Jose in California, United States
San Juan Bautista de Las Misiones, ParaguaySan Juan de Cuyo, ArgentinaSan Juan de La Maguana, Dominican Republic
San Juan de los Lagos, MexicoSan Juan de Puerto Rico, Puerto RicoSan Justo, Argentina
Sankt Gallen, Switzerland
Sankt Pölten, Austria
San Lorenzo, Paraguay
San Luis, ArgentinaSan Luis Potosí, MexicoSan Marco Argentano–Scalea, Italy
San Marcos, Guatemala
San Marino–Montefeltro, San Marino & Italy
San Martín, Argentina
San Miguel, El Salvador
San Miguel, Argentina
San Miguel de Sucumbíos, Apostolic Vicariate, Ecuador
San Miniato, Italy
San Nicolás de los Arroyos, Argentina
San Pablo, Philippines
San Pedro, Paraguay
San Pedro de Macorís, Dominican Republic
San Pedro-en-Côte d'Ivoire, Côte d'Ivoire
San Pedro Sula, Honduras
San Rafael, Argentina
San Ramón, Apostolic Vicariate, Peru
San Roque de Presidencia Roque Sáenz Peña, ArgentinaSan Salvador, El SalvadorSan Sebastián, Spain
San Severo, Italy
Santa Ana, El Salvador
Santa Clara, CubaSanta Cruz de la Sierra, BoliviaSanta Cruz do Sul, Brazil
Santa Elena, EcuadorSanta Fe, United StatesSanta Fe de Antioquia, ColombiaSanta Fe de la Vera Cruz, ArgentinaSanta Maria, BrazilSanta Maria di Grottaferrata, Italo-Albanese Territorial Abbacy, Italy
Santa María de Los Ángeles, Chile
Santa María del Patrocinio en Buenos Aires, Ukrainian Catholic Eparchy, in Buenos Aires, Argentina
Santa Marta, Colombia
Santander, SpainSant'Angelo dei Lombardi–Conza–Nusco–Bisaccia, ItalySantarém, Portugal
Santarém, Brazil
Santa Rosa, Argentina
Santa Rosa, United States
Santa Rosa de Copán, Honduras
Santa Rosa de Lima, Guatemala
Santa Rosa de Osos, Colombia
Sant Feliu de Llobregat, Spain
Santiago Apóstol de Huancané, Territorial Prelature, Peru
Santiago de Cabo Verde, Cape VerdeSantiago de Chile, ChileSantiago de Compostela, SpainSantiago de Cuba, CubaSantiago del Estero, ArgentinaSantiago de los Caballeros, Dominican RepublicSantiago de María, El Salvador
Santiago de Veraguas, Panama
Santísimo Salvador de Bayamo y Manzanillo, Cuba
Santíssima Conceição do Araguaia, Brazil
Santo Amaro, Brazil
Santo André, Brazil
Santo Ângelo, Brazil
Santo Cristo de Esquipulas, Territorial Prelature, GuatemalaSanto Domingo, Dominican RepublicSanto Domingo de los Colorados, Ecuador
Santorini, Greece
Santos, Brazil
Santo Tomé, Argentina
San Vicente, El Salvador
San Vicente del Caguán, Colombia
Sanyuan, China
São Carlos, Brazil
São Félix (do Araguaia), Territorial Prelature, Brazil
São Gabriel da Cachoeira, BrazilSão João Batista em(=in) Curitiba (Ukrainian), Ukrainian Catholic Archeparchy, BrazilSão João Batista em Curitiba (Latin), Brazil
São João da Boa Vista, Brazil
São João del Rei, Brazil
São José do Rio Preto, Brazil
São José dos Campos, Brazil
São José dos Pinhais, Brazil
São Luís de Cáceres, Brazil
São Luís de Montes Belos, BrazilSão Luís do Maranhão, BrazilSão Mateus, Brazil
São Miguel Paulista, BrazilSão Paulo, BrazilSão Raimundo Nonato, BrazilSão Salvador da Bahia, BrazilSão Sebastião do Rio de Janeiro, BrazilSão Tomé and Príncipe, São Tomé and Príncipe
Sapë, Albania
Sapporo, Japan
Sarh, Chad
Saskatoon, Canada
Saskatoon, Ukrainian Catholic Eparchy, CanadaSassari, ItalySatna, India
Satu Mare, Romania
Sault Sainte Marie, CanadaSaurímo, AngolaSavannah, United States
Savannakhet, Apostolic Vicariate, Cambodia
Savona-Noli, Italy
Scranton, United StatesSeattle, United StatesSées, France
Segheneyti, Eritrean Catholic Eparchy, Eritrea
Segorbe–Castellón de la Plana, Spain
Ségou, Mali
Segovia, Spain
Sekondi–Takoradi, GhanaSemarang, IndonesiaSendai, Japan
Senigallia, ItalySens, FranceSeoul, South KoreaSerrinha, Brazil
Sessa Aurunca, Italy
Sete Lagoas, Brazil
Setúbal, PortugalSevilla, SpainShamshabad, Syro-Malabar Catholic Eparchy, IndiaShanghai, ChinaShantou, China
Shaoyang (Baoqing, Paoking), Apostolic prefecture, China PR
Shaozhou, China
Shendam, NigeriaShenyang, ChinaSherbrooke, Canada's-Hertogenbosch, NetherlandsShillong, IndiaShimoga, India
Shinan, China
Shinyanga, TanzaniaShkodër–Pult, AlbaniaShreveport, United States
Shrewsbury, United Kingdom
Shunde, China
Shunqing, China
Shuozhou, China
Šiauliai, Lithuania
Šibenik, Croatia
Sibolga, Indonesia
Sibu, Malaysia
Sicuani, Peru
Siedlce, PolandSiena–Colle di Val d'Elsa–Montalcino, ItalySigüenza–Guadalajara, Spain
Sikasso, Mali
Simdega, India
Simferopol (Crimea, Krym), Ukrainian Catholic Archiepiscopal Exarchate, Ukraine 
Simla and Chandigarh, India
Sincelejo, Colombia
Sindhudurg, IndiaSingapore, SingaporeSingida, Tanzania
Sinop, Brazil
Sintang, Indonesia
Sion, Switzerland
Sioux City, United States
Sioux Falls, United States
Sipingjie, ChinaSiracusa, ItalySisak, Croatia
Siuna, Nicaragua
Sivagangai, India
Skopje, Macedonia
Soacha, Colombia
Sobral, Brazil
Socorro y San Gil, Colombia
Soddo, Apostolic Vicariate, Ethiopia
Sofia-Plovdiv, Bulgaria
Sohag, Coptic Catholic Eparchy, Egypt
Soissons, France
Sokal-Zhovkva, Ukrainian Catholic Eparchy, Ukraine
Sokodé, Togo
Sokoto, Nigeria
Sololá–Chimaltenango, Guatemala
Solsona, Spain
Solwezi, ZambiaSongea, TanzaniaSonsonate, El Salvador
Sonsón–Rionegro, Colombia
Sora-Aquino-Pontecorvo, ItalySorocaba, BrazilSoroti, UgandaSorrento-Castellammare di Stabia, ItalySorsogon, Philippines
Sosnowiec, Poland
Southern Arabia, Apostolic Vicariate, in Abu Dhabi, UAESouthwark, United KingdomSpeyer, Germany
Spiš, SlovakiaSplit–Makarska, CroatiaSpokane, United StatesSpoleto-Norcia, ItalySpringfield in Illinois, United States
Springfield in Massachusetts, United States
Springfield-Cape Girardeau, United States
Srijem, Serbia
Srikakulam, India
Stamford, Ukrainian Catholic Eparchy, United States
Steubenville, United States
Stockholm, Sweden
Stockton, United StatesStrasbourg, FranceStryi, Ukrainian Catholic Eparchy, Ukraine
Subotica, Serbia
Suchitepéquez–Retalhuleu, GuatemalaSucre, BoliviaSuifu, ChinaSuiyuan, ChinaSulaimaniya, Chaldean Catholic – see Kirkuk-Sulaimaniya, Iraq
Sulmona-Valva, Italy
Sultanpet, India
Sumbawanga, Tanzania
Sumbe, Angola
Sunyani, Ghana
Superior, United States
Surabaya, Indonesia
Surat Thani, Thailand
Surigao, Philippines
Susa, ItalySuva, FijiSuwon, South Korea
Suzhou, China
Świdnica, PolandSydney (Roman Catholic), AustraliaSydney, Saint Thomas the Apostle of -, Chaldean Catholic Eparchy, Australia
Sydney, Saint Maron of -, Maronite Eparchy, Australia
Sydney, Saint Michael's of, Melkite Greek Eparchy, Australia
Sylhet, Bangladesh
Syracuse, United States
Syros–Milos, GreeceSzczecin–Kamień, PolandSzeged-Csanád, Hungary
Székesfehérvár, Hungary
Szombathely, Hungary

T
Tabasco, MexicoTabora, TanzaniaTabuk, Apostolic Vicariate, Philippines 
Tacámbaro, Mexico
Tacna y Moquegua, Peru
Tacuarembó, UruguayTaegu (Daegu), South KoreaTaejŏn: see Daejeon
Tagbilaran, Philippines
Tagum, Philippines
Taichung, Taiwan
Tainan, Taiwan
Taiohae o Tefenuaenata, French PolynesiaTaipei, TaiwanTaiyuan, China PRTaizhou, China PR
Takamatsu, Japan
Talca, Chile
Talibon, PhilippinesTamale, GhanaTambacounda, Senegal
Tampico, Mexico
Tandag, Philippines
Tanga, TanzaniaTanger, MoroccoTanjore, India
Tanjungkarang, Indonesia
Tanjung Selor, Indonesia
Tapachula, Mexico
Tarahumara, MexicoTaranto, ItalyTarawa and Nauru, Kiribati & Nauru
Tarazona, Spain
Tarbes-et-Lourdes, France
Tarija, Bolivia
Tarlac, Philippines
Tarma, Peru
Tarnów, PolandTarragona, SpainTaubaté, BrazilTaunggyi, MyanmarTaungngu, Myanmar
Taytay, Apostolic Vicariate, Philippines
Teano-Calvi, Italy
Techiman, Ghana
Tefé, Territorial Prelature, Brazil
Teggiano-Policastro, ItalyTegucigalpa, HondurasTeheran-Isfahan, IranTehran, Chaldean Catholic Metropolitan, IranTehuacán, Mexico
Tehuantepec, Mexico
Teixeira de Freitas-Caravelas, BrazilTellicherry, IndiaTelšiai, Lithuania
Timişoara, Romania
Tempio-Ampurias, Italy
Temuco, Chile
Tenancingo, Mexico
Teotihuacan, Mexico
Teófilo Otoni, Brazil
Tepic, Mexico
Teramo-Atri, ItalyTeresina, BrazilTermoli-Larino, Italy
Terni-Narni-Amelia, ItalyTernopil – Zboriv, Ukrainian Catholic Archeparchy, UkraineTerrassa, Spain
Teruel y Albarracín, Spain
Tete, Mozambique
Texcoco, Mexico
Tezpur, India
Thái Bình, Vietnam
Thamarasserry, Syro-Malabar Eparchy, India
Thanh Hóa, VietnamThare and Nonseng, ThailandThessaloniki, Apostolic Vicariate, Greece
Thiès, Senegal
Thuckalay, India
Thunder Bay, Canada
Tianguá, Brazil
Tianjin, China PR
Tibú, Colombia
Tierradentro, Apostolic Vicariate, ColombiaTijuana, MexicoTilarán, Costa Rica
Timika, Indonesia
Timişoara, Romania
Timmins, Canada
Tingzhou, China PRTiranë–Durrës, AlbaniaTiruchirapalli, IndiaTiruvalla, Syro-Malankara Catholic Archeparchy, IndiaTivoli, ItalyTlalnepantla, MexicoTlapa, Mexico
Tlaxcala, MexicoToamasina, MadagascarTocantinópolis, BrazilTokyo, JapanTôlagnaro, MadagascarToledo, SpainToledo, United States
Toledo, BrazilToliara, MadagascarToluca, Mexico
Tombura-Yambio, Sudan
Tonga, Tonga & Niue
Toowoomba, AustraliaTorino, ItalyTorit, SudanToronto, CanadaToronto, Mar Addai of, Chaldean Catholic Eparchy, Canada
Toronto, Saints Cyril and Methodius of, Slovak Catholic Eparchy, Canada
Toronto and Eastern Canada, Ukrainian Catholic Eparchy, CanadaTororo, UgandaTorreón, Mexico
Tortona, Italy
Tortosa, Spain
Toruń, PolandToulouse, FranceTournai, BelgiumTours, FranceTownsville, AustraliaTranti-Barletta-Bisceglie, ItalyTransfiguration at Novosibirsk, Russia
Trapani, ItalyTrento, ItalyTrenton, United States
Três Lagoas, Brazil
Treviso, Italy
Tricarico, ItalyTrichur, Syro-Malabar Catholic Archeparchy, IndiaTrier, Germany
Trieste, Italy
Trincomalee, Sri Lanka
Trinidad, Apostolic Vicariate, ColombiaTripoli, Maronite Eparchy, LebanonTripoli (Lebanon), Melkite*, LebanonTripoli (Libya), Apostolic Vicariate, LibyaTrivandrum, Syro-Malankara Catholic Metropolitan Archeparchy and Major Archdiocesis, IndiaTrivento, ItalyTrnava, SlovakiaTrois-Rivières, Canada
Tromsø, Territorial Prelature, Norway
Trondheim, Territorial Prelature, Norway
Troyes, FranceTrujillo, PeruTrujillo, Honduras
Trujillo, Venezuela
Tshumbe, Democratic Republic of the Congo
Tsiroanomandidy, MadagascarTuam, IrelandTubarão, Brazil
Tucson, United StatesTucumán, ArgentinaTucupita, Apostolic Vicariate, VenezuelaTuguegarao, PhilippinesTui-Vigo, Spain
Tula, MexicoTulancingo, MexicoTulcán, Ecuador
Tulle, France
Tulsa, United States
Tumaco, Colombia
Tunduru–Masasi, TanzaniaTunis, TunisiaTunja, ColombiaTura, India
Tursi-Lagonegro, Italy
Tuticorin, India
Tuxpan, Mexico
Tuxtepec, MexicoTuxtla Gutiérrez, MexicoTyler, United StatesTyre, Melkite Metropolitan Archeparchy, LebanonTyre, Maronite Archeparchy, LebanonTzaneen, South Africa

UUberaba, BrazilUberlândia, Brazil
Ubon Ratchathani, Thailand
Udaipur, IndiaUdine, ItalyUdon Thani, Thailand
Udupi, India
Ugento-Santa Maria de Leuca, Italy
Uíje, Angola
Uijeongbu (Uijongbu), South Korea
Ujjain, India
Ulaanbaatar (Ulan Bator), Apostolic prefecture, (Outer) Mongolia
Umtata, South Africa
Umuahia, Nigeria
Umuarama, Brazil
Umzimkulu, South Africa
União da Vitória, BrazilUrbino–Urbania–Sant'Angelo in Vado, ItalyUrdaneta, Philippines
Urgell, Spain & AndorraUrmya, IranUromi, Nigeria
Uruaçu, Brazil
Uruguaiana, BrazilUtrecht, NetherlandsUvira, Democratic Republic of the Congo
Uyo, Nigeria

V
Vác, Hungary
Vacaria, BrazilVaduz, LiechtensteinValdivia, Chile
Valença, Brazil
Valence, FranceValencia, SpainValencia, VenezuelaValladolid, SpainValle de Chalco, Mexico
Valle de la Pascua, Venezuela
Valledupar, Colombia
Valleyfield, Canada
Vallo della Lucania, Italy
Valparaíso, ChileVancouver, CanadaVanimo, Papua New Guinea
Vannes, France
Varanasi, India
Varaždin, Croatia
Vasai, India
Vélez, Colombia
Velletri-Segni, Italy
Vellore, India
Venado Tuerto, ArgentinaVenezia, ItalyVenice in Florida, United States
Ventimiglia-San Remo, Italy
Veracruz, Mexico
Roman Catholic Diocese of Verapaz, Cobán, GuatemalaVerapoly, IndiaVercelli, ItalyVerdun, France
Verona, Italy
Versailles, FranceVeszprém, HungaryViana, Brazil
Viana, Angola
Viana do Castelo, Portugal
Vic, Spain
Vicenza, Italy
Victoria, Canada
Victoria in Texas, United States
Viedma, Argentina
Vientiane, Apostolic Vicariate, Laos
Vigevano, Italy
Vijayapuram, India
Vijayawada, India
Vila Real, Portugal
Vilkaviškis, Lithuania
Villa de la Concepción del Río Cuarto, Argentina
Villa María, Argentina
Villarrica, Chile
Villarrica del Espíritu Santo, ParaguayVillavicencio, ColombiaVilnius, LithuaniaVinh, Vietnam
Vĩnh Long, Vietnam
Virac, PhilippinesVisakhapatnam, IndiaViseu, Portugal
Vitebsk, Belarus
Viterbo, ItalyVitória, BrazilVitória da Conquista, BrazilVitoria, Spain
Vittorio Veneto, Italy
Viviers, France
Volterra, ItalyVrhbosna, Bosnia and HerzegovinaW
Wa, Ghana
Wabag, Papua New Guinea
Wagga Wagga, Australia
Wallis et Futuna, Wallis and Futuna
Wamba, Democratic Republic of the Congo
Wanxian, China
Warangal, IndiaWarmia, PolandWarri, NigeriaWarszawa, PolandWarszawa-Praga, PolandWashington, United StatesWaterford and Lismore, Ireland
Wau, Sudan
Weetebula, Indonesia
Weihui, ChinaWellington, New ZealandWestern Sahara, Apostolic prefecture, Western SaharaWestminster, United KingdomWewak, Papua New Guinea
Wheeling-Charleston, United States
Whitehorse, Canada
Wiawso, Ghana
Wichita, United StatesWien, AustriaWilcannia-Forbes, Australia
Willemstad, Netherlands Antilles & Aruba
Wilmington, United StatesWindhoek, NamibiaWinnipeg, CanadaWinnipeg, CanadaWinona, United States
Witbank, South Africa
Włocławek, Poland
Wollongong, Australia
Wonju, South Korea
Worcester, United States
Wrexham, United KingdomWrocław, PolandWrocław-Gdańsk, Poland
Wuchang, China
Wuhu, China
Würzburg, Germany
Wuzhou, China

X
Xai-Xai, MozambiqueXalapa, MexicoXiamen, ChinaXi'an, ChinaXiangyang, China
Xianxian, China
Xingu, Territorial Prelature, Brazil
Xinyang, China
Xiwanzi, China
Xuân Lôc, Vietnam
Xuanhua, China
Xuzhou, China

Y
Yagoua, Cameroon
Yakima, United States
Yamoussoukro, Côte d'Ivoire
Yan'an, China
Yanggu, ChinaYangon (Rangoon), BurmaYanji, China
Yantai, China
Yanzhou, ChinaYaoundé, CameroonYarmouth, Canada
Yauyos, Territorial Prelature, Peru
Yei, Sudan
Yendi, Ghana
Yingkou, China
Yizhou, China
Yokadouma, Cameroon
Yokohama, Japan
Yola, Nigeria
Yongjia, China
Yopal, Colombia
Yopougon, Côte d'Ivoire
Yoro, HondurasYucatán, MexicoYoungstown, United States
Yuanling, China
Yuci, China
Yujiang, China
Yurimaguas, Apostolic Vicariate, Peru
Yuzhno Sakhalinsk, Apostolic prefecture, Russia

Z
Zacapa y Santo Cristo de Esquipulas, Guatemala
Zacatecas, Mexico
Zacatecoluca, El SalvadorZadar, CroatiaZagreb, CroatiaZahleh, LebanonZahleh and Furzol, LebanonZaku, IraqZamboanga, PhilippinesZamora (in Ecuador), Apostolic Vicariate, Ecuador
Zamora (in Mexico), Mexico
Zamora (in Spain), Spain
Zamość-Lubaczów, Poland
Zanzibar, TanzaniaZaragoza, Spain'''
Zárate-Campana, Argentina
Zaria, Nigeria
Zé Doca, Brazil
 Zhaotong (Chaotung), Apostolic Prefecture, China PR
Zhaoxian, China
Zhengding, China
Zhengzhou, China
Zhoucun, China
Zhouzhi, China
Zhumadian, China
Zielona Góra-Gorzów, Poland
Ziguinchor, Senegal
Žilina, Slovakia
Zipaquirá, Colombia
Zomba, Malawi
Zrenjanin, Serbia
|}

 List of Personal dioceses and ordinariates 
 Latin Church
 Opus Dei, the only personal prelature with a cathedral see (Santa Maria della Pace ai Parioli) in Rome, ranking as bishopric São João Maria Vianney, the only Personal Apostolic Administration Personal Ordinariates  Chair of Saint Peter, for Canada and USA, with cathedral see in Houston, Texas Our Lady of the Southern Cross, for Australia and Japan Our Lady of Walsingham, for England and Wales and for Scotland, i.e. Great Britain List of Lists of Catholic dioceses 
 List of Catholic dioceses (structured view) (including episcopal conferences)

 Lists of types of Catholic jurisdictions 
 List of Roman Catholic archdioceses
 Military ordinariate
 List of Roman Catholic apostolic administrations
 List of Roman Catholic apostolic vicariates
 List of Eastern Catholic exarchates
 List of Roman Catholic apostolic prefectures
 List of Roman Catholic territorial prelatures
 List of Roman Catholic missions sui juris

Dioceses (or (arch)eparchies) of the Eastern Catholic Churches
 List of Armenian dioceses
 List of Chaldean dioceses
 Coptic Catholic dioceses
 Ethiopic Catholic dioceses
 Melkite Catholic dioceses
 Maronite dioceses
 Ruthenian dioceses
 Syro-Malabar Catholic dioceses
 Syriac Catholic dioceses
 Ukrainian Greek Catholic dioceses

 Lists of dioceses by country or continental region

Europe
 List of Catholic dioceses in Albania
 List of Catholic dioceses in Austria
 List of Catholic dioceses in Belarus
 List of Catholic dioceses in Belgium
 List of Catholic dioceses in Bosnia and Herzegovina
 List of Catholic dioceses in Croatia
 List of Catholic dioceses in the Czech Republic
 List of Catholic dioceses in Great Britain (UK)
 List of Catholic dioceses in France
 List of Catholic dioceses in Germany
 List of Catholic dioceses in Greece
 List of Catholic dioceses in Hungary
 List of Catholic dioceses in Ireland (including Northern Ireland, UK)
 List of Catholic dioceses in Italy
 List of Catholic dioceses in Latvia
 List of Catholic dioceses in Lithuania
 List of Catholic dioceses in Montenegro
 List of Catholic dioceses in the Netherlands
 List of Catholic dioceses in Poland
 List of Catholic dioceses in Portugal
 List of Catholic dioceses in Romania
 List of Catholic dioceses in Russia
 List of Catholic dioceses in Serbia
 List of Catholic dioceses in Slovakia
 List of Catholic dioceses in Slovenia
 List of Catholic dioceses in Spain
 List of Catholic dioceses in Switzerland
 List of Catholic dioceses in Ukraine

Asia
 List of Catholic dioceses in Bangladesh
 List of Catholic dioceses in Myanmar
 List of Catholic dioceses in China (includes People's Republic of China and Taiwan)
 List of Catholic dioceses in East Timor
 List of Catholic dioceses in India
 List of Catholic dioceses in Indonesia
 List of Catholic dioceses in Iran
 List of Catholic dioceses in Japan
 List of Catholic dioceses in Korea
 List of Catholic dioceses in Malaysia
 List of Catholic dioceses in Pakistan
 List of Catholic dioceses in the Philippines
 List of Catholic dioceses in Sri Lanka and the Maldives
 List of Catholic dioceses in Thailand
 List of Catholic dioceses in Vietnam

 Americas and Oceania 
 List of Roman Catholic dioceses in Argentina
 List of Roman Catholic dioceses in Australia
 List of Roman Catholic dioceses in Bolivia
 List of Catholic dioceses in Brazil
 List of Catholic dioceses in Canada
 List of Roman Catholic dioceses in Chile
 List of Roman Catholic dioceses in Colombia
 List of Roman Catholic dioceses in Costa Rica
 List of Roman Catholic dioceses in Cuba
 List of Roman Catholic dioceses in the Dominican Republic
 List of Roman Catholic dioceses in Ecuador
 List of Roman Catholic dioceses in El Salvador
 List of Roman Catholic dioceses in Guatemala
 List of Roman Catholic dioceses in Haiti
 List of Roman Catholic dioceses in Honduras
 List of Roman Catholic dioceses in Mexico
 List of Roman Catholic dioceses in New Zealand
 List of Roman Catholic dioceses in Nicaragua
 List of Roman Catholic dioceses in North Korea
 List of Catholic dioceses in North America List of Catholic dioceses in Oceania''
 List of Roman Catholic dioceses in Panama
 List of Roman Catholic dioceses in Papua New Guinea
 List of Roman Catholic dioceses in Paraguay
 List of Roman Catholic dioceses in Peru
 List of the Catholic dioceses of the United States
 List of Roman Catholic dioceses in Uruguay
 List of Roman Catholic dioceses in Venezuela

Africa 
 List of Roman Catholic dioceses in Angola
 List of Roman Catholic dioceses in Benin
 List of Roman Catholic dioceses in Botswana
 List of Roman Catholic dioceses in Burkina Faso
 List of Roman Catholic dioceses in Burundi
 List of Roman Catholic dioceses in Cameroon
 List of Roman Catholic dioceses in Cape Verde
 List of Roman Catholic dioceses in the Central African Republic
 List of Roman Catholic dioceses in Chad
 List of Roman Catholic dioceses in the Republic of the Congo
 List of Roman Catholic dioceses in the Democratic Republic of the Congo
 List of Roman Catholic dioceses in Djibouti
 List of Roman Catholic dioceses in Egypt
 List of Roman Catholic dioceses in Equatorial Guinea
 List of Catholic dioceses in Ethiopia
 List of Roman Catholic dioceses in Gabon
 List of Roman Catholic dioceses in the Gambia
 List of Roman Catholic dioceses in Ghana
 List of Roman Catholic dioceses in Guinea
 List of Roman Catholic dioceses in Guinea-Bissau
 List of Roman Catholic dioceses in Ivory Coast
 List of Roman Catholic dioceses in Kenya
 List of Roman Catholic dioceses in Lesotho
 List of Roman Catholic dioceses in Liberia
 List of Roman Catholic dioceses in Libya
 List of Roman Catholic dioceses in Madagascar
 List of Roman Catholic dioceses in Malawi
 List of Roman Catholic dioceses in Mali
 List of Roman Catholic dioceses in Mauritania
 List of Roman Catholic dioceses in Mauritius
 List of Roman Catholic dioceses in Morocco
 List of Roman Catholic dioceses in Mozambique
 List of Roman Catholic dioceses in Namibia
 List of Roman Catholic dioceses in Niger
 List of Roman Catholic dioceses in Nigeria
 List of Roman Catholic dioceses in Réunion
 List of Roman Catholic dioceses in Rwanda
 List of Roman Catholic dioceses in São Tomé and Príncipe
 List of Roman Catholic dioceses in Senegal
 List of Roman Catholic dioceses in Sierra Leone
 List of Roman Catholic dioceses in Somalia
 List of Roman Catholic dioceses in South Africa
 List of Roman Catholic dioceses in South Sudan
 List of Roman Catholic dioceses in Sudan
 List of Roman Catholic dioceses in Swaziland
 List of Roman Catholic dioceses in Tanzania
 List of Roman Catholic dioceses in Uganda
 List of Roman Catholic dioceses in Zambia

See also 
 List of current patriarchs

Other Christian denominations 
 List of Anglican dioceses and archdioceses
 List of Lutheran dioceses and archdioceses
 List of Orthodox dioceses and archdioceses

Notes

Sources and external links 
 
 Catholic-Hierarchy.org – lists every diocese in the Catholic Church, and their bishops throughout history.

Alphabetical
Alphabetical